Donald Trump's tenure as the 45th president of the United States began with his inauguration on January20, 2017, and ended on January20, 2021. Trump, a Republican from New York City, took office following his Electoral College victory over Democratic nominee Hillary Clinton in the 2016 presidential election, in which he lost the popular vote to Clinton by nearly three million votes. Upon his inauguration, he became the first president in American history without prior public office or military background. Trump made an unprecedented number of false or misleading statements during his campaign and presidency. His presidency ended with defeat in the 2020 presidential election to Democrat Joe Biden after one term in office.

Trump was unsuccessful in his efforts to repeal the Affordable Care Act but took measures to hinder its functioning and rescinded the individual mandate. Trump sought substantial spending cuts to major welfare programs, including Medicare and Medicaid. He signed the Great American Outdoors Act, reversed numerous environmental regulations, and withdrew from the Paris Agreement on climate change. He signed criminal justice reform through the First Step Act and appointed Neil Gorsuch, Brett Kavanaugh, and Amy Coney Barrett to the Supreme Court. In economic policy, he partially repealed the Dodd–Frank Act and signed the Tax Cuts and Jobs Act of 2017. He enacted tariffs, triggering retaliatory tariffs from China, Canada, Mexico, and the European Union. He withdrew from the Trans-Pacific Partnership negotiations and signed the United States–Mexico–Canada Agreement, a successor agreement to NAFTA. The federal deficit increased under Trump due to spending increases and tax cuts.

He implemented a controversial family separation policy for migrants apprehended at the United States–Mexico border. Trump's demand for the federal funding of a border wall resulted in the longest US government shutdown in history. He deployed federal law enforcement forces in response to the racial unrest in 2020. Trump's "America First" foreign policy was characterized by unilateral actions, disregarding traditional allies. The administration implemented a major arms sale to Saudi Arabia; denied citizens from several Muslim-majority countries entry into the United States; recognized Jerusalem as the capital of Israel; and brokered the Abraham Accords, a series of normalization agreements between Israel and various Arab states. His administration withdrew United States troops from northern Syria, allowing Turkey to occupy the area. His administration also made a conditional deal with the Taliban to withdraw United States troops from Afghanistan in 2021. Trump met North Korea's leader Kim Jong-un three times. Trump withdrew the United States from the Iran nuclear agreement and later escalated tensions in the Persian Gulf by ordering the assassination of General Qasem Soleimani.

Robert Mueller's Special Counsel investigation (2017–2019) concluded that Russia interfered to favor Trump's candidacy and that while the prevailing evidence "did not establish that members of the Trump campaign conspired or coordinated with the Russian government", possible obstructions of justice occurred during the course of that investigation.

Trump attempted to pressure Ukraine to announce investigations into his political rival Joe Biden, triggering his first impeachment by the House of Representatives on December18, 2019, but he was acquitted by the Senate on February5, 2020.

Trump reacted slowly to the COVID-19 pandemic, ignored or contradicted many recommendations from health officials in his messaging, and promoted misinformation about unproven treatments and the availability of testing.

Following his loss in the 2020 presidential election to Biden, Trump refused to concede and initiated an extensive campaign to overturn the results, making false claims of widespread electoral fraud. On January 6, 2021, during a rally at the Ellipse, Trump urged his supporters to "fight like hell" and march to the capitol, where the electoral votes were being counted by Congress in order to formalize Biden's victory. A mob of Trump supporters stormed the capitol, suspending the count and causing Vice President Mike Pence and other members of Congress to be evacuated. On January 13, the House voted to impeach Trump an unprecedented second time for "incitement of insurrection", but he was later acquitted by the Senate again on February13, after he had already left office. Trump had historically low approval ratings, and scholars and historians rank his presidency as one of the worst in American history.

Election and inauguration 

On November 9, 2016, Republicans Donald Trump of New York and Governor Mike Pence of Indiana won the 2016 election, defeating Democrats former Secretary of State Hillary Clinton of New York and Senator Tim Kaine of Virginia. Trump won 304 electoral votes compared to Clinton's 227, though Clinton won a plurality of the popular vote, receiving nearly 2.9 million more votes than Trump. Trump thus became the fifth person to win the presidency while losing the popular vote. In the concurrent congressional elections, Republicans maintained majorities in both the House of Representatives and the Senate.

Trump was inaugurated on January 20, 2017. He was sworn in by Chief Justice John Roberts. In his seventeen-minute inaugural address, Trump painted a dark picture of contemporary America, pledging to end "American carnage" caused by urban crime and saying America's "wealth, strength, and confidence has dissipated" by jobs lost overseas. He declared his strategy would be "America First." The largest single-day protest in U.S. history, the Women's March, took place the day after his inauguration and was driven by opposition to Trump and his policies and views.

Administration 

The Trump administration was characterized by record turnover, particularly among White House staff. By early 2018, 43% of senior White House positions had turned over. The administration had a higher turnover rate in the first two and a half years than the five previous presidents did over their entire terms.

By October 2019, one in 14 of Trump's political appointees were former lobbyists; less than three years into his presidency, Trump had appointed more than four times as many lobbyists than predecessor Barack Obama did over the course of his first six years in office.

Trump's cabinet included U.S. senator from Alabama Jeff Sessions as Attorney General, banker Steve Mnuchin as Treasury Secretary, retired Marine Corps general James Mattis as Defense Secretary, and ExxonMobil CEO Rex Tillerson as Secretary of State. Trump also brought on board politicians who had opposed him during the presidential campaign, such as neurosurgeon Ben Carson as Secretary of Housing and Urban Development, and South Carolina governor Nikki Haley as Ambassador to the United Nations.

Cabinet 

Days after the presidential election, Trump selected RNC Chairman Reince Priebus as his Chief of Staff. Trump chose Sessions for the position of Attorney General.

In February 2017, Trump formally announced his cabinet structure, elevating the Director of National Intelligence and Director of the Central Intelligence Agency to cabinet level. The Chair of the Council of Economic Advisers, which had been added to the cabinet by Obama in 2009, was removed from the cabinet. Trump's cabinet consisted of 24 members, more than Obama at 23 or George W. Bush at 21.

On February 13, 2017, Trump fired Michael Flynn from the post of National Security Advisor on grounds that he had lied to Vice President Pence about his communications with Russian Ambassador Sergey Kislyak; Flynn later pleaded guilty to lying to the Federal Bureau of Investigation (FBI) about his contacts with Russia. Flynn was fired amidst the ongoing controversy concerning Russian interference in the 2016 election and accusations that Trump's electoral team colluded with Russian agents.

In July 2017, John F. Kelly, who had served as secretary of Homeland Security, replaced Priebus as Chief of Staff. In September 2017, Tom Price resigned as Secretary of HHS amid criticism over his use of private charter jets for personal travel. Kirstjen Nielsen succeeded Kelly as Secretary in December 2017. Secretary of State Rex Tillerson was fired via a tweet in March 2018; Trump appointed Mike Pompeo to replace Tillerson and Gina Haspel to succeed Pompeo as the Director of the CIA. In the wake of a series of scandals, Scott Pruitt resigned as Administrator of the Environmental Protection Agency (EPA) in July 2018. Secretary of Defense Jim Mattis informed Trump of his resignation following Trump's abrupt December 19, 2018, announcement that the remaining 2,000 American troops in Syria would be withdrawn, against the recommendations of his military and civilian advisors.

Trump fired numerous inspectors general of agencies, including those who were probing the Trump administration and close Trump associates. In 2020, he fired five inspectors general in two months. The Washington Post wrote, "For the first time since the system was created in the aftermath of the Watergate scandal, inspectors general find themselves under systematic attack from the president, putting independent oversight of federal spending and operations at risk."

Dismissal of James Comey 

Trump dismissed FBI Director James Comey on May 9, 2017, saying he had accepted the recommendations of Attorney General Sessions and Deputy Attorney General Rod Rosenstein to dismiss Comey. Sessions's recommendation was based on Rosenstein's, while Rosenstein wrote that Comey should be dismissed for his handling of the conclusion of the FBI investigation into the Hillary Clinton email controversy. On May 10, Trump met Russian Foreign Minister Sergey Lavrov and Russian Ambassador Sergey Kislyak. Based on White House notes of the meeting, Trump told the Russians, "I just fired the head of the FBI. He was crazy, a real nut job... I faced great pressure because of Russia. That's taken off." On May 11, Trump said in a videoed interview, "...regardless of recommendation, I was going to fire Comey... in fact, when I decided to just do it, I said to myself, I said, you know, this Russia thing with Trump and Russia is a made-up story." On May 18, Rosenstein told members of the U.S. Senate that he recommended Comey's dismissal while knowing Trump had already decided to fire Comey. In the aftermath of Comey's firing, the events were compared with those of the "Saturday Night Massacre" during Richard Nixon's administration and there was debate over whether Trump had provoked a constitutional crisis, as he had dismissed the man leading an investigation into Trump's associates. Trump's statements raised concerns of potential obstruction of justice. In Comey's memo about a February 2017 meeting with Trump, Comey said Trump attempted to persuade him to abort the investigation into Flynn.

Judicial appointments 

After Republicans won control of the U.S. Senate in 2014, only 28.6 percent of judicial nominees were confirmed, "the lowest percentage of confirmations from 1977 to 2018". At the end of the Obama presidency, 105 judgeships were vacant. Senate Republicans, led by Senate Majority Leader Mitch McConnell, prioritized confirming Trump's judicial appointees, doing so rapidly. By November 2018, Trump had appointed 29 judges to the U.S. courts of appeals, more than any modern president in the first two years of a presidential term.

Trump ultimately appointed 226 Article III federal judges and 260 federal judges in total. His appointees, who were usually affiliated with the conservative Federalist Society, shifted the judiciary to the right. A third of Trump's appointees were under 45 years old when appointed, far higher than under previous presidents. Trump's judicial nominees were less likely to be female or ethnic minority than those of the previous administration. Of Trump's judicial appointments to the U.S. courts of appeals (circuit courts), two-thirds were white men, compared to 31% of Obama nominees and 63% of George W. Bush nominees.

Supreme Court nominations 

Trump made three nominations to the Supreme Court: Neil Gorsuch, Brett Kavanaugh, and Amy Coney Barrett:
 Trump nominated Neil Gorsuch in January 2017 to fill the vacancy left by the death of Justice Antonin Scalia in February 2016, which had not been filled by Obama because the Republican-majority Senate did not consider the nomination of Merrick Garland. Gorsuch was confirmed in April 2017 in a mostly party-line vote of 54–45. Gorsuch's confirmation was one of Trump's major first year accomplishments, made as part of a "100day pledge".
 Trump nominated Brett Kavanaugh in July 2018 to replace retiring Justice Anthony Kennedy, who was considered a key swing vote on the Supreme Court. The Senate confirmed Kavanaugh in a mostly party-line vote of 50–48 in August 2018 after allegations that Kavanaugh had attempted to rape another student when they were both in high school; Kavanaugh denied the allegation.
 Trump nominated Amy Coney Barrett in September 2020 to fill the vacancy left by the death of Justice Ruth Bader Ginsburg. Ginsburg was considered part of the Court's liberal wing and her replacement with a conservative jurist substantially changed the ideological composition of the Supreme Court. Democrats opposed the nomination, arguing that the court vacancy should not be filled until after the 2020 presidential election. On October 26, 2020, the Senate confirmed Barrett by a mostly party-line vote of 52–48, with all Democrats opposing her confirmation.

Leadership style 
Trump's own staffers, subordinates, and allies frequently characterized Trump as infantile. Trump reportedly eschewed reading detailed briefing documents, including the President's Daily Brief, in favor of receiving oral briefings. Intelligence briefers reportedly repeated the President's name and title in order to keep his attention. He was also known to acquire information by watching up to eight hours of television each day, most notably Fox News programs such as Fox & Friends and Hannity, whose broadcast talking points Trump sometimes repeated in public statements, particularly in early morning tweets. Trump reportedly expressed anger if intelligence analyses contradicted his beliefs or public statements, with two briefers stating they had been instructed by superiors to not provide Trump with information that contradicted his public statements.

Trump had reportedly fostered chaos as a management technique, resulting in low morale and policy confusion among his staff. Trump proved unable to effectively compromise during the 115th U.S. Congress, which led to significant governmental gridlock and few notable legislative accomplishments despite Republican control of both houses of Congress. Presidential historian Doris Kearns Goodwin found Trump lacked several traits of an effective leader, including "humility, acknowledging errors, shouldering blame and learning from mistakes, empathy, resilience, collaboration, connecting with people and controlling unproductive emotions."

In January 2018, Axios reported Trump's working hours were typically around 11:00a.m. to 6:00p.m. (a later start and an earlier end compared to the beginning of his presidency) and that he was holding fewer meetings during his working hours in order to accommodate Trump's desire for more unstructured free time (labelled as "executive time"). In 2019, Axios published Trump's schedule from November 7, 2018, to February 1, 2019, and calculated that around sixty percent of the time between 8:00a.m. and 5:00p.m. was "executive time."

False and misleading statements 

The number and scale of Trump's statements in public speeches, remarks, and tweets identified as false by scholars, fact-checkers, and commentators were characterized as unprecedented for an American president and even unprecedented in U.S. politics. The New Yorker called falsehoods a distinctive part of his political identity, and they have also been described by Republican political advisor Amanda Carpenter as a gaslighting tactic. His White House had dismissed the idea of objective truth and his campaign and presidency have been described as being "post-truth" and hyper-Orwellian. Trump's rhetorical signature included disregarding data from federal institutions that was incompatible to his arguments; quoting hearsay, anecdotal evidence, and questionable claims in partisan media; denying reality (including his own statements); and distracting when falsehoods were exposed.

During the first year of Trump's presidency, The Washington Post fact-checking team wrote that Trump was "the most fact-challenged politician" it had "ever encountered... the pace and volume of the president's misstatements means that we cannot possibly keep up." As president, Trump made more than 5,000 false or misleading claims by September 2018, and by April 2020, Trump had made 18,000 false or misleading claims while in office, an average of more than 15 claims daily. The rate of Trump's false and misleading statements increased in the weeks preceding the 2018 midterm elections and in the first half of 2020. The most common false or misleading claims by Trump involved the economy and jobs, his border wall proposal, and his tax legislation; he had also made false statements regarding prior administrations as well as other topics, including crime, terrorism, immigration, Russia and the Mueller probe, the Ukraine probe, immigration, and the COVID-19 pandemic. Senior administration officials had also regularly given false, misleading, or tortured statements to the news media, which made it difficult for the news media to take official statements seriously.

Rule of law 
Shortly before Trump secured the 2016 Republican nomination, The New York Times reported "legal experts across the political spectrum say" Trump's rhetoric reflected "a constitutional worldview that shows contempt for the First Amendment, the separation of powers and the rule of law," adding "many conservative and libertarian legal scholars warn that electing Mr. Trump is a recipe for a constitutional crisis." Political scientists warned that candidate Trump's rhetoric and actions mimicked those of other politicians who ultimately turned authoritarian once in office. Some scholars have concluded that during Trump's tenure as president and largely due to his actions and rhetoric, the U.S. has experienced democratic backsliding. Many prominent Republicans have expressed similar concerns that Trump's perceived disregard for the rule of law betrayed conservative principles.

During the first two years of his presidency, Trump repeatedly sought to influence the Department of Justice to investigate Clinton, the Democratic National Committee, and Comey. He persistently repeated a variety of allegations, at least some of which had already been investigated or debunked. In spring 2018, Trump told White House counsel Don McGahn he wanted to order the Department of Justice to prosecute Clinton and Comey, but McGahn advised Trump such action would constitute abuse of power and invite possible impeachment. In May 2018, Trump demanded that the Department of Justice investigate "whether or not the FBI/DOJ infiltrated or surveilled the Trump Campaign for Political Purposes," which the Department of Justice referred to its inspector general. Although it is not unlawful for a president to exert influence on the Department of Justice to open an investigation, presidents have assiduously avoided doing so to prevent perceptions of political interference.

Sessions resisted several demands by Trump and his allies for investigations of political opponents, causing Trump to repeatedly express frustration, saying at one point, "I don't have an attorney general." While criticizing the special counsel investigation in July 2019, Trump falsely claimed that the Constitution ensures that "I have to the right to do whatever I want as president." Trump had on multiple occasions either suggested or promoted views of extending his presidency beyond normal term limits.

Trump frequently criticized the independence of the judiciary for unfairly interfering in his administration's ability to decide policy. In November 2018, in an extraordinary rebuke of a sitting president, Roberts criticized Trump's characterization of a judge who had ruled against his policies as an "Obama judge," adding "That's not law." In October 2020, twenty Republican former U.S. attorneys, among them appointees by each Republican president since Eisenhower, characterized Trump as "a threat to the rule of law in our country." Greg Brower, who worked in the Trump administration, asserted, "It's clear that President Trump views the Justice Department and the FBI as his own personal law firm and investigative agency."

Relationship with the news media 

Early into his presidency, Trump developed a highly contentious relationship with the news media, repeatedly referring to them as the "fake news media" and "the enemy of the people." As a candidate, Trump had refused press credentials for offending publications but said he would not do so if elected. Trump both privately and publicly mused about taking away critical reporters' White House press credentials. At the same time, the Trump White House gave temporary press passes to far-right pro-Trump fringe outlets, such as InfoWars and The Gateway Pundit, which are known for publishing hoaxes and conspiracy theories.

On his first day in office, Trump falsely accused journalists of understating the size of the crowd at his inauguration and called the news media "among the most dishonest human beings on earth." Trump's claims were notably defended by Press Secretary Sean Spicer, who claimed the inauguration crowd had been the biggest in history, a claim disproven by photographs. Trump's senior adviser Kellyanne Conway then defended Spicer when asked about the falsehood, saying it was an "alternative fact," not a falsehood.

The administration frequently sought to punish and blocked access for reporters that broke stories about the administration. Trump frequently criticized right-wing media outlet Fox News for being insufficiently supportive of him, threatening to lend his support for alternatives to Fox News on the right. On August 16, 2018, the Senate unanimously passed a resolution affirming that "the press is not the enemy of the people."

The relationship between Trump, the news media, and fake news has been studied. One study found that between October7 and November 14, 2016, while one in four Americans visited a fake news website, "Trump supporters visited the most fake news websites, which were overwhelmingly pro-Trump" and "almost 6in 10 visits to fake news websites came from the 10% of people with the most conservative online information diets." Brendan Nyhan, one of the authors of the study, said in an interview, "People got vastly more misinformation from Donald Trump than they did from fake news websites."

In October 2018, Trump praised U.S. Representative Greg Gianforte for assaulting political reporter Ben Jacobs in 2017. According to analysts, the incident marked the first time the president has "openly and directly praised a violent act against a journalist on American soil." Later that month, as CNN and prominent Democrats were targeted with mail bombs, Trump initially condemned the bomb attempts but shortly thereafter blamed the "Mainstream Media that I refer to as Fake News" for causing "a very big part of the anger we see today in our society."

The Trump Justice Department obtained by court order the 2017 phone logs or email metadata of reporters from CNN, The New York Times, The Washington Post, BuzzFeed, and Politico as part of investigations into leaks of classified information.

Twitter 

Trump continued his use of Twitter following the presidential campaign. He continued to personally tweet from @realDonaldTrump, his personal account, while his staff tweet on his behalf using the official @POTUS account. His use of Twitter was unconventional for a president, with his tweets initiating controversy and becoming news in their own right. Some scholars have referred to his time in office as the "first true Twitter presidency." The Trump administration described Trump's tweets as "official statements by the President of the United States." The federal judge Naomi Reice Buchwald ruled in 2018 that Trump's blocking of other Twitter users due to opposing political views violated the First Amendment and he must unblock them. The ruling was upheld on appeal.

His tweets have been reported as ill-considered, impulsive, vengeful, and bullying, often being made late at night or in the early hours of the morning. His tweets about a Muslim ban were successfully turned against his administration to halt two versions of travel restrictions from some Muslim-majority countries. He has used Twitter to threaten and intimidate his political opponents and potential political allies needed to pass bills. Many tweets appear to be based on stories Trump has seen in the media, including far-right news websites such as Breitbart and television shows such as Fox & Friends.

Trump used Twitter to attack federal judges who ruled against him in court cases and to criticize officials within his own administration, including then-Secretary of State Rex Tillerson, then-National Security Advisor H. R. McMaster, Deputy Attorney General Rod Rosenstein, and, at various times, Attorney General Jeff Sessions. Tillerson was eventually fired via a tweet by Trump. Trump also tweeted that his Justice Department is part of the American "deep state"; that "there was tremendous leaking, lying and corruption at the highest levels of the FBI, Justice & State" Departments; and that the special counsel investigation is a "WITCH HUNT!" In August 2018, Trump used Twitter to write that Attorney General Jeff Sessions "should stop" the special counsel investigation immediately; he also referred to it as "rigged" and its investigators as biased.

 In February 2020, Trump tweeted criticism of the prosecutors' proposed sentence for Trump's former aide Roger Stone. A few hours later, the Justice Department replaced the prosecutors' proposed sentence with a lighter proposal. This gave the appearance of presidential interference in a criminal case and caused a strong negative reaction. All four of the original prosecutors withdrew from the case; more than a thousand former Department of Justice lawyers signed a letter condemning the action. On July 10, Trump commuted the sentence of Stone days before he was due to report to prison.

In response to the mid-2020 George Floyd protests, some of which resulted in looting, Trump tweeted on May 25 that "when the looting starts, the shooting starts." Not long after, Twitter restricted the tweet for violating the company's policy on promoting violence. On May 28, Trump signed an executive order which sought to limit legal protections of social media companies.

On January 8, 2021, Twitter announced that they had permanently suspended Trump's personal account "due to the risk of further incitement of violence" following the Capitol attack. Trump announced in his final tweet before the suspension that he would not attend the inauguration of Joe Biden. Other social media platforms like Facebook, Snapchat, YouTube and others also suspended the official handles of Donald Trump.

Domestic affairs

Agriculture 

Due to Trump's trade tariffs combined with depressed commodities prices, American farmers faced the worst crisis in decades. Trump provided farmers $12billion in direct payments in July 2018 to mitigate the negative impacts of his tariffs, increasing the payments by $14.5billion in May 2019 after trade talks with China ended without agreement. Most of the administration's aid went to the largest farms. Politico reported in May 2019 that some economists in the United States Department of Agriculture were being punished for presenting analyses showing farmers were being harmed by Trump's trade and tax policies, with six economists having more than 50 years of combined experience at the Service resigning on the same day. Trump's fiscal 2020 budget proposed a 15% funding cut for the Agriculture Department, calling farm subsidies "overly generous".

Consumer protections 
The administration reversed a Consumer Financial Protection Bureau (CFPB) rule that had made it easier for aggrieved consumers to pursue class actions against banks; the Associated Press characterized the reversal as a victory for Wall Street banks. Under Mick Mulvaney's tenure, the CFPB reduced enforcement of rules that protected consumers from predatory payday lenders. Trump scrapped a proposed rule from the Obama administration that airlines disclose baggage fees. Trump reduced enforcement of regulations against airlines; fines levied by the administration in 2017 were less than half of what the Obama administration did the year before.

Criminal justice 

The New York Times summarized the Trump administration's "general approach to law enforcement" as "cracking down on violent crime", "not regulating the police departments that fight it", and overhauling "programs that the Obama administration used to ease tensions between communities and the police". Trump reversed a ban on providing federal military equipment to local police departments and reinstated the use of civil asset forfeiture. The administration stated that it would no longer investigate police departments and publicize their shortcomings in reports, a policy previously enacted under the Obama administration. Later, Trump falsely claimed that the Obama administration never tried to reform the police.

In December 2017, Sessions and the Department of Justice rescinded a 2016 guideline advising courts against imposing large fines and fees on poor defendants.

Despite Trump's pro-police rhetoric, his 2019 budget plan proposed nearly fifty percent cuts to the COPS Hiring Program which provides funding to state and local law enforcement agencies to help hire community policing officers. Trump appeared to advocate police brutality in a July 2017 speech to police officers, prompting criticism from law enforcement agencies. In 2020, the Inspector General of the Department of Justice criticized the Trump administration for reducing police oversight and eroding public confidence in law enforcement.

In December 2018, Trump signed the First Step Act, a bipartisan criminal justice reform bill which sought to rehabilitate prisoners and reduce recidivism, notably by expanding job training and early-release programs, and lowering mandatory minimum sentences for nonviolent drug offenders.

The number of prosecutions of child-sex traffickers has showed a decreasing trend under the Trump administration relative to the Obama administration. Under the Trump administration, the SEC charged the fewest number of insider trading cases since the Reagan administration.

Presidential pardons and commutations 

During his presidency, Trump pardoned or commuted the sentences of 237 individuals. Most of those pardoned had personal or political connections to Trump. A significant number had been convicted of fraud or public corruption. Trump circumvented the typical clemency process, taking no action on more than ten thousand pending applications, using the pardon power primarily on "public figures whose cases resonated with him given his own grievances with investigators".

Drug policy 

In a May 2017 departure from the policy of the Department of Justice under Obama to reduce long jail sentencing for minor drug offenses and contrary to a growing bipartisan consensus, the administration ordered federal prosecutors to seek maximum sentencing for drug offenses. In a January 2018 move that created uncertainty regarding the legality of recreational and medical marijuana, Sessions rescinded a federal policy that had barred federal law enforcement officials from aggressively enforcing federal cannabis law in states where the drug is legal. The administration's decision contradicted then-candidate Trump's statement that marijuana legalization should be "up to the states". That same month, the VA said it would not research cannabis as a potential treatment against PTSD and chronic pain; veterans organizations had pushed for such a study.

Capital punishment 
During Trump's term (in 2020 and in January 2021), the federal government executed thirteen people ; the first executions since 2002. In this time period, Trump oversaw more federal executions than any president in the preceding 120 years.

Disaster relief

Hurricanes Harvey, Irma, and Maria 

Three hurricanes hit the U.S. in August and September 2017: Harvey in southeastern Texas, Irma on the Florida Gulf coast, and Maria in Puerto Rico. Trump signed into law $15billion in relief for Harvey and Irma, and later $18.67billion for all three. The administration came under criticism for its delayed response to the humanitarian crisis on Puerto Rico. Politicians of both parties had called for immediate aid for Puerto Rico, and criticized Trump for focusing on a feud with the National Football League instead. Trump did not comment on Puerto Rico for several days while the crisis was unfolding. According to The Washington Post, the White House did not feel a sense of urgency until "images of the utter destruction and desperationand criticism of the administration's responsebegan to appear on television." Trump dismissed the criticism, saying distribution of necessary supplies was "doing well". The Washington Post noted, "on the ground in Puerto Rico, nothing could be further from the truth." Trump also criticized Puerto Rico officials. A BMJ analysis found the federal government responded much more quickly and on a larger scale to the hurricane in Texas and Florida than in Puerto Rico, despite the fact that the hurricane in Puerto Rico was more severe. A 2021 HUD Inspector General investigation found that the Trump administration erected bureaucratic hurdles which stalled approximately $20 billion in hurricane relief for Puerto Rico.

At the time of FEMA's departure from Puerto Rico, one third of Puerto Rico residents still lacked electricity and some places lacked running water. A New England Journal of Medicine study estimated the number of hurricane-related deaths during the period September 20 to December 31, 2017, to be around 4,600 (range 793–8,498) The official death rate due to Maria reported by the Commonwealth of Puerto Rico is 2,975; the figure was based on an independent investigation by George Washington University commissioned by the governor of Puerto Rico. Trump falsely claimed the official death rate was wrong, and said the Democrats were trying to make him "look as bad as possible".

California wildfires 

Trump misleadingly blamed the destructive wildfires in 2018 in California, on "gross" and "poor" "mismanagement" of forests by California, saying there was no other reason for these wildfires. The fires in question were not "forest fires"; most of the forest was owned by federal agencies; and climate change in part contributed to the fires.

In September 2020, California's worst wildfires in history prompted Trump to visit the state. In a briefing to state officials, Trump said that federal assistance was necessary, and again baselessly asserted that the lack of forestry, not climate change, is the underlying cause of the fires.

Economy 

Trump's economic policies have centered on cutting taxes, deregulation, and trade protectionism. Trump primarily stuck to or intensified traditional Republican economic policy positions that benefitted corporate interests or the affluent, with the exception of his trade protectionist policies. Deficit spending, combined with tax cuts for the wealthy, caused the U.S. national debt to sharply increase.

One of Trump's first actions was to indefinitely suspend a cut in fee rates for federally-insured mortgages implemented by the Obama administration which saved individuals with lower credit scores around $500 per year on a typical loan. Upon taking office, Trump halted trade negotiations with the European Union on the Transatlantic Trade and Investment Partnership, which had been underway since 2013.

The administration proposed changes to the Supplemental Nutrition Assistance Program (food stamps), which if implemented would lead millions to lose access to food stamps and limit the amount of benefits for remaining recipients.

During his tenure, Trump repeatedly sought to intervene in the economy to affect specific companies and industries. Trump sought to compel power grid operators to buy coal and nuclear energy, and sought tariffs on metals to protect domestic metal producers. Trump also publicly attacked Boeing and Lockheed Martin, sending their stocks tumbling. Trump repeatedly singled out Amazon for criticism and advocated steps that would harm the company, such as ending an arrangement between Amazon and the United States Postal Service (USPS) and raising taxes on Amazon. Trump expressed opposition to the merger between Time Warner (the parent company of CNN) and AT&T.

The Trump campaign ran on a policy of reducing America's trade deficit, particularly with China. The overall trade deficit increased during Trump's presidency. The goods deficit with China reached a record high for the second consecutive year in 2018.

A 2021 study, which used the synthetic control method, found no evidence Trump had an impact on the U.S. economy during his time in office. Analysis conducted by Bloomberg News at the end of Trump's second year in office found that his economy ranked sixth among the last seven presidents, based on fourteen metrics of economic activity and financial performance. Trump repeatedly and falsely characterized the economy during his presidency as the best in American history.

In February 2020, amid the COVID-19 pandemic, the U.S. entered a recession.

Taxation 

In September 2017, Trump proposed the most sweeping federal tax overhaul in many years. Trump signed the tax legislation on December 22, 2017, after it passed Congress on party-line votes. The tax bill was the first major legislation signed by Trump. The $1.5 trillion bill reduced the corporate federal tax rate from 35% to 21%, its lowest point since 1939. The bill also cut the individual tax rate, reducing the top rate from 39.6% to 37%, although these individual tax cuts expire after 2025; as a result, "by 2027, every income group making less than $75,000 would see a net tax increase." The bill doubled the estate tax exemption (to $22 million for married couples); and allowed the owners of pass-through businesses to deduct 20% of business income. The bill doubled the standard deduction while eliminating many itemized deductions, including the deduction for state and local taxes. The bill also repeated the individual health insurance mandate contained in the Affordable Care Act.

According to The New York Times, the plan would result in a "huge windfall" for the very wealthy but would not benefit those in the bottom third of the income distribution. The nonpartisan Tax Policy Center estimated that the richest 0.1% and 1% would benefit the most in raw dollar amounts and percentage terms from the tax plan, earning 10.2% and 8.5% more income after taxes respectively. Middle-class households would on average earn 1.2% more after tax, but 13.5% of middle class households would see their tax burden increase. The poorest fifth of Americans would earn 0.5% more. Treasury Secretary Steven Mnuchin argued that the corporate income tax cut would benefit workers the most, while the nonpartisan Joint Committee on Taxation, the Congressional Budget Office and many economists estimated that owners of capital would benefit vastly more than workers. A preliminary estimate by the Committee for a Responsible Federal Budget found that the tax plan would add more than $2trillion over the next decade to the federal debt, while the Tax Policy Center found that it would add $2.4trillion to the debt. A 2019 Congressional Research Service analysis found that the tax cuts had "a relatively small (if any) first-year" growth effect on the economy. A 2019 analysis by the Committee for a Responsible Federal Budget concluded that Trump's policies will add $4.1trillion to the national debt from 2017 to 2029. Around $1.8trillion of debt is projected to eventually arise from the 2017 Tax Cuts and Jobs Act.

Trade 

In March 2018, Trump imposed tariffs on solar panels and washing machines of 30–50%. In March 2018, he imposed tariffs on steel (25%) and aluminum (10%) from most countries, which covered an estimated 4.1% of U.S. imports. On June 1, 2018, this was extended to the European Union, Canada, and Mexico. In separate moves, the Trump administration has set and escalated tariffs on goods imported from China, leading to a trade war. The tariffs angered trading partners, who implemented retaliatory tariffs on U.S. goods, and adversely affected real income and GDP. A CNBC analysis found that Trump "enacted tariffs equivalent to one of the largest tax increases in decades", while Tax Foundation and Tax Policy Center analyses found the tariffs could wipe out the benefits of the Tax Cuts and Jobs Act of 2017 for many households. The two countries reached a "phase one" truce agreement in January 2020. The bulk of the tariffs remained in place until talks were to resume after the 2020 election. Trump provided $28 billion in cash aid to farmers affected by the trade war. Studies have found that the tariffs also adversely affected Republican candidates in elections. An analysis published by The Wall Street Journal in October 2020 found the trade war did not achieve the primary objective of reviving American manufacturing, nor did it result in the reshoring of factory production.

Three weeks after Republican Senator Chuck Grassley, chairman of the Senate Finance Committee, wrote an April 2019 Wall Street Journal op-ed entitled "Trump's Tariffs End or His Trade Deal Dies", stating "Congress won't approve USMCA while constituents pay the price for Mexican and Canadian retaliation," Trump lifted steel and aluminum tariffs on Mexico and Canada. Two weeks later, Trump unexpectedly announced he would impose a 5% tariff on all imports from Mexico on June 10, increasing to 10% on July 1, and by another 5% each month for three months, "until such time as illegal migrants coming through Mexico, and into our Country, STOP". Grassley commented the move as a "misuse of presidential tariff authority and counter to congressional intent". That same day, the Trump administration formally initiated the process to seek congressional approval of USMCA. Trump's top trade advisor, U.S. Trade Representative Robert Lighthizer, opposed the new Mexican tariffs on concerns it would jeopardize passage of USMCA. Treasury secretary Steven Mnuchin and Trump senior advisor Jared Kushner also opposed the action. Grassley, whose committee is instrumental in passing USMCA, was not informed in advance of Trump's surprise announcement. On June 7, Trump announced the tariffs would be "indefinitely suspended" after Mexico agreed to take actions, including deploying its National Guard throughout the country and along its southern border. The New York Times reported the following day that Mexico had actually agreed to most of the actions months earlier.

As a presidential candidate in 2016, Trump pledged to withdraw from the Trans-Pacific Partnership, a trade agreement with eleven Pacific Rim nations which the United States had signed earlier that year. China was not a party to the agreement, which was intended to allow the United States to guide trade relations in the region. He incorrectly asserted the deal was flawed because it contained a "back door" that would allow China to enter the agreement later. Trump announced the American withdrawal from the deal days after taking office. Upon the American withdrawal, the remaining partners renamed it the Comprehensive and Progressive Agreement for Trans-Pacific Partnership. In September 2021, China formally applied to join that agreement in an effort to replace the United States as its hub; China's state-run Global Times said the move would "cement the country's leadership in global trade" and leave the United States "increasingly isolated."

Education 

Trump appointed Betsy DeVos as his Secretary of Education. Her nomination was confirmed on a 50–50 Senate vote with Vice President Pence called upon to break the tie (the first time a vice president had cast a tie-breaking vote on a Cabinet nomination). Democrats opposed DeVos as underqualified, while Republicans supported DeVos because of her strong support of school choice.

In 2017, Trump revoked an Obama administration memo which provided protections for people in default on student loans. The United States Department of Education cancelled agreements with the Consumer Financial Protection Bureau (CFPB) to police student loan fraud. The administration rescinded a regulation restricting federal funding to for-profit colleges unable to demonstrate that college graduates had a reasonable debt-to-earnings ratio after entering the job market. Seth Frotman, the CFPB student loan ombudsman, resigned, accusing the Trump administration of undermining the CFPB's work on protecting student borrowers. DeVos marginalized an investigative unit within the Department of Education that under Obama investigated predatory activities by for-profit colleges. An investigation started under Obama into the practices of DeVry Education Group, which operates for-profit colleges, was halted in early 2017, and the former dean at DeVry was made into the supervisor for the investigative unit later that summer. DeVry paid a $100million fine in 2016 for defrauding students.

In 2017, DeVos said the Obama administration's guidance for how campuses address sexual assault "failed too many students" and she announced that she intended to replace the current approach "with a workable, effective and fair system". Consequently, the administration scrapped an Obama administration guidance on how schools and universities should combat sexual harassment and sexual violence. DeVos criticized the guidance for undermining the rights of those accused of sexual harassment.

Election integrity 
On the eve of the 2018 midterm elections, Politico described the Trump administration's efforts to combat election propaganda as "rudderless". At the same time, U.S. intelligence agencies warned about "ongoing campaigns" by Russia, China, and Iran to influence American elections.

Energy 

The administration's "America First Energy Plan" did not mention renewable energy and instead focused on fossil fuels. The administration enacted 30% tariffs on imported solar panels. The American solar energy industry is highly reliant on foreign parts (80% of parts are made abroad); as a result, the tariffs could raise the costs of solar energy, reduce innovation and reduce jobs in the industrywhich in 2017 employed nearly four times as many American workers as the coal industry. The administration reversed standards put in place to make commonly used lightbulbs more energy-efficient.

Trump rescinded a rule requiring oil, gas and mining firms to disclose how much they paid foreign governments, and withdrew from the international Extractive Industries Transparency Initiative (EITI) which required disclosure of payments by oil, gas and mining companies to governments.

In 2017, Trump ordered the reversal of an Obama-era ban on new oil and gas leasing in the Arctic Ocean and environmentally sensitive areas of the North Atlantic coast, in the Outer Continental Shelf. Trump's order was halted by a federal court, which ruled in 2019 that it unlawfully exceeded his authority. Trump also revoked the 2016 Well Control Rule, a safety regulation adopted after the Deepwater Horizon oil spill; this action is the subject of legal challenges from environmental groups.

In January 2018, the administration singled out Florida for exemption from the administration's offshore drilling plan. The move stirred controversy because it came after Florida Governor Rick Scott, who was considering a 2018 Senate run, complained about the plan. The move raised ethical questions about the appearance of "transactional favoritism" because Trump owns a coastal resort in Florida, and because of the state's status as a crucial "swing state" in the 2020 presidential election. Other states sought similar offshore drilling exemptions, and litigation ensued.

Despite rhetoric about boosting the coal industry, coal-fueled electricity generating capacity declined faster during Trump's presidency than during any previous presidential term, falling 15% with the idling of 145 coal-burning units at 75 power plants. An estimated 20% of electricity was expected to be generated by coal in 2020, compared to 31% in 2017.

Environment 

By October 2020, the administration had overturned 72 environmental regulations and was in process of reversing an additional 27. A 2018 American Journal of Public Health study found that in Trump's first six months in office, the United States Environmental Protection Agency adopted a pro-business attitude unlike that of any previous administration, as it "moved away from the public interest and explicitly favored the interests of the regulated industries".

Analyses of EPA enforcement data showed that the Trump administration brought fewer cases against polluters, sought a lower total of civil penalties and made fewer requests of companies to retrofit facilities to curb pollution than the Obama and Bush administrations. According to The New York Times, "confidential internal E.P.A. documents show that the enforcement slowdown coincides with major policy changes ordered by Mr. Pruitt's team after pleas from oil and gas industry executives." In 2018, the administration referred the lowest number of pollution cases for criminal prosecution in 30 years. Two years into Trump's presidency, The New York Times wrote he had "unleashed a regulatory rollback, lobbied for and cheered on by industry, with little parallel in the past half-century". In June 2018, David Cutler and Francesca Dominici of Harvard University estimated conservatively that the Trump administration's modifications to environmental rules could result in more than 80,000 additional U.S. deaths and widespread respiratory ailments. In August 2018, the administration's own analysis showed that loosening coal plant rules could cause up to 1,400 premature deaths and 15,000 new cases of respiratory problems. From 2016 to 2018, air pollution increased by 5.5%, reversing a seven-year trend where air pollution had declined by 25%.

All references to climate change were removed from the White House website, with the sole exception of mentioning Trump's intention to eliminate the Obama administration's climate change policies. The EPA removed climate change material on its website, including detailed climate data. In June 2017, Trump announced U.S. withdrawal from the Paris Agreement, a 2015 climate change accord reached by 200 nations to cut greenhouse gas emissions. In December 2017, Trumpwho had repeatedly called scientific consensus on climate a "hoax" before becoming presidentfalsely implied that cold weather meant climate change was not occurring. Through executive order, Trump reversed multiple Obama administration policies meant to tackle climate change, such as a moratorium on federal coal leasing, the Presidential Climate Action Plan, and guidance for federal agencies on taking climate change into account during National Environmental Policy Act action reviews. Trump also ordered reviews and possibly modifications to several directives, such as the Clean Power Plan (CPP), the estimate for the "social cost of carbon" emissions, carbon dioxide emission standards for new coal plants, methane emissions standards from oil and natural gas extraction, as well as any regulations inhibiting domestic energy production. The administration rolled back regulations requiring the federal government to account for climate change and sea-level rise when building infrastructure. The EPA disbanded a 20-expert panel on pollution which advised the EPA on the appropriate threshold levels to set for air quality standards.

The administration has repeatedly sought to reduce the EPA budget. The administration invalidated the Stream Protection Rule, which limited dumping of toxic wastewater containing metals, such as arsenic and mercury, into public waterways, regulations on coal ash (carcinogenic leftover waste produced by coal plants), and an Obama-era executive order on protections for oceans, coastlines and lakes enacted in response to the Deepwater Horizon oil spill. The administration refused to act on recommendations from EPA scientists urging greater regulation of particulate pollution.

The administration rolled back major Clean Water Act protections, narrowing the definition of the "waters of the United States" under federal protection. Studies by the Obama-era EPA suggest that up to two-thirds of California's inland freshwater streams would lose protections under the rule change. The EPA sought to repeal a regulation which required oil and gas companies to restrict emissions of methane, a potent greenhouse gas. The EPA rolled back automobile fuel efficiency standards introduced in 2012. The EPA granted a loophole allowing a small set of trucking companies to skirt emissions rules and produce glider trucks that emit 40 to 55 times the air pollutants of other new trucks. The EPA rejected a ban on the toxic pesticide chlorpyrifos; a federal court then ordered the EPA to ban chlorpyrifos, because the EPA's own extensive research showed it caused adverse health effects in children. The administration scaled back the ban on the use of the solvent methylene chloride, and lifted a rule requiring major farms to report pollution emitted through animal waste.

The administration suspended funding on several environmental research studies, a multi-million-dollar program that distributed grants for research the effects of chemical exposure on children and $10-million-a-year research line for NASA's Carbon Monitoring System. including an unsuccessful attempt to kill aspects of NASA's climate science program.

The EPA expedited the process for approving new chemicals and made the process of evaluating the safety of those chemicals less stringent; EPA scientists expressed concerns that the agency's ability to stop hazardous chemicals was being compromised. Internal emails showed that Pruitt aides prevented the publication of a health study showing some toxic chemicals endanger humans at far lower levels than the EPA previously characterized as safe. One such chemical was present in high quantities around several military bases, including groundwater. The non-disclosure of the study and the delay in public knowledge of the findings may have prevented the government from updating the infrastructure at the bases and individuals who lived near the bases to avoid the tap water.

The administration weakened enforcement the Endangered Species Act, making it easier to start mining, drilling and construction projects in areas with endangered and threatened species. The administration has actively discouraged local governments and businesses from undertaking preservation efforts.

The administration sharply reduced the size of two national monuments in Utah by approximately two million acres, making it the largest reduction of public land protections in American history. Shortly afterwards, Interior Secretary Ryan Zinke advocated for downsizing four additional national monuments and changing the way six additional monuments were managed. In 2019, the administration sped up the process for environmental reviews for oil and gas drilling in the Arctic; experts said the speeding up made reviews less comprehensive and reliable. According to Politico, the administration sped up the process in the event that a Democratic administration was elected in 2020, which would have halted new oil and gas leases in the Arctic National Wildlife Refuge. The administration sought to open up more than 180,000 acres of the Tongass National Forest in Alaska, the largest in the country, for logging.

In April 2018, Pruitt announced a policy change prohibiting EPA regulators from considering scientific research unless the raw data of the research was made publicly available. This would limit EPA regulators' use of much environmental research, given that participants in many such studies provide personal health information which is kept confidential. The EPA cited two bipartisan reports and various nonpartisan studies about the use of science in government to defend the decision. However, the authors of those reports dismissed that the EPA followed their instructions, with one author saying, "They don't adopt any of our recommendations, and they go in a direction that's opposite, completely different. They don't adopt any of the recommendations of any of the sources they cite."

In July 2020, Trump moved to weaken the National Environmental Policy Act by limiting public review to speed up permitting.

Government size and regulations 
The administration imposed far fewer financial penalties against banks and major companies accused of wrong-doing relative to the Obama administration.

In the first six weeks of his tenure, Trump suspendedor in a few cases, revokedmore than 90 regulations. In early 2017, Trump signed an executive order directing federal agencies to slash two existing regulations for every new one (without spending on regulations going up). A September 2017 Bloomberg BNA review found that due to unclear wording in the order and the large proportion of regulations it exempts, the order had had little effect since it was signed. The Trump OMB released an analysis in February 2018 indicating the economic benefits of regulations significantly outweigh the economic costs. The administration ordered one-third of government advisory committees for federal agencies eliminated, except for committees that evaluate consumer product safety or committees that approve research grants.

Trump ordered a four-month government-wide hiring freeze of the civilian work force (excluding staff in the military, national security, public safety and offices of new presidential appointees) at the start of his term. He said he did not intend to fill many of the governmental positions that were still vacant, as he considered them unnecessary; there were nearly 2,000 vacant government positions.

The administration ended the requirement that nonprofits, including political advocacy groups who collect so-called dark money, disclose the names of large donors to the IRS; the Senate voted to overturn the administration's rule change.

Guns 

The administration banned bump stocks after such devices were used by the gunman who perpetrated the 2017 Las Vegas shooting. In the wake of several mass shootings during the Trump administration, including August 2019 shootings in El Paso, Texas and Dayton, Ohio, Trump called on states to implement red flag laws to remove guns from "those judged to pose a grave risk to public safety". By November 2019, he abandoned the idea of red-flag laws. Trump repealed a regulation that barred gun ownership from approximately 75,000 individuals who received Social Security checks due to mental illness and who were deemed unfit to handle their financial affairs. The administration ended U.S. involvement in the UN Arms Trade Treaty to curb the international trade of conventional arms with countries having poor human rights records.

Health care 

The 2010 Affordable Care Act (also known as "Obamacare" or the ACA) elicited major opposition from the Republican Party from its inception, and Trump called for a repeal of the law during the 2016 election campaign. On taking office, Trump promised to pass a healthcare bill that would cover everyone and result in better and less expensive insurance. Throughout his presidency, Trump repeatedly asserted that his administration and Republicans in Congress supported protections for individuals with preexisting conditions; however, fact-checkers noted the administration supported attempts both in Congress and in the courts to roll back the ACA (and its protections for preexisting conditions).

Congressional Republicans made two serious efforts to repeal the ACA. First, in March 2017, Trump endorsed the American Health Care Act (AHCA), a Republican bill to repeal and replace the ACA. Opposition from several House Republicans, both moderate and conservative, led to the defeat of this version of the bill. Second in May 2017, the House narrowly voted in favor of a new version of the AHCA to repeal the ACA, sending the bill to the Senate for deliberation. Over the next weeks the Senate made several attempts to create a repeal bill; however, all the proposals were ultimately rejected in a series of Senate votes in late July. The individual mandate was repealed in December 2017 by the Tax Cuts and Jobs Act. The Congressional Budget Office estimated in May 2018 that repealing the individual mandate would increase the number of uninsured by eight million and that individual healthcare insurance premiums had increased by ten percent between 2017 and 2018. The administration later sided with a lawsuit to overturn the ACA, including protections for individuals with pre-existing conditions.

Trump repeatedly expressed a desire to "let Obamacare fail", and the Trump administration undermined Obamacare through various actions. The open enrollment period was cut from twelve weeks to six, the advertising budget for enrollment was cut by 90%, and organizations helping people shop for coverage got 39% less money. The CBO found that ACA enrollment at health care exchanges would be lower than its previous forecasts due to the Trump administration's undermining of the ACA. A 2019 study found that enrollment into the ACA during the Trump administration's first year was nearly thirty percent lower than during 2016. The CBO found that insurance premiums would rise sharply in 2018 due to the Trump administration's refusal to commit to continuing paying ACA subsidies, which added uncertainty to the insurance market and led insurers to raise premiums for fear they will not get subsidized.

The administration ended subsidy payments to health insurance companies, in a move expected to raise premiums in 2018 for middle-class families by an average of about twenty percent nationwide and cost the federal government nearly $200billion more than it saved over a ten-year period. The administration made it easier for businesses to use health insurance plans not covered by several of the ACA's protections, including for preexisting conditions, and allowed organizations not to cover birth control. In justifying the action, the administration made false claims about the health harms of contraceptives.

The administration proposed substantial spending cuts to Medicare, Medicaid and Social Security Disability Insurance. Trump had previously vowed to protect Medicare and Medicaid. The administration reduced enforcement of penalties against nursing homes that harm residents. As a candidate and throughout his presidency, Trump said he would cut the costs of pharmaceuticals. During his first seven months in office, there were 96 price hikes for every drug price cut. Abandoning a promise he made as candidate, Trump announced he would not allow Medicare to use its bargaining power to negotiate lower drug prices.

Reproductive rights 
Trump reinstated the Mexico City policy prohibiting funding to foreign non-governmental organizations that perform abortions as a method of family planning in other countries. The administration implemented a policy restricting taxpayer dollars given to family planning facilities that mention abortion to patients, provide abortion referrals, or share space with abortion providers. As a result, Planned Parenthood, which provides TitleX birth control services to 1.5 million women, withdrew from the program. Throughout his presidency, Trump pressed for a ban on late-term abortions and made frequent false claims about them.

In 2018, the administration prohibited scientists at the National Institutes of Health (NIH) from acquiring new fetal tissue for research, and a year later stopped all medical research by government scientists that used fetal tissue.

The administration geared HHS funding towards abstinence education programs for teens rather than the comprehensive sexual education programs the Obama administration funded.

Opioid epidemic 

Trump nominated Tom Marino to become the nation's drug czar but the nomination was withdrawn after an investigation found he had been the chief architect of a bill that crippled the enforcement powers of the Drug Enforcement Administration and worsened the opioid crisis.

Kellyanne Conway led White House efforts to combat the opioid epidemic; Conway had no experience or expertise on matters of public health, substance abuse, or law enforcement. Conway sidelined drug experts and opted instead for the use of political staff. Politico wrote in 2018 that the administration's "main response" to the opioid crisis "so far has been to call for a border wall and to promise a 'just say no' campaign".

In October 2017, the administration declared a 90-day public health emergency over the opioid epidemic and pledged to urgently mobilize the federal government in response to the crisis. On January 11, 2018, twelve days before the declaration ran out, Politico noted that "beyond drawing more attention to the crisis, virtually nothing of consequence has been done." The administration had not proposed any new resources or spending, had not started the promised advertising campaign to spread awareness about addiction, and had yet to fill key public health and drug positions in the administration. One of the top officials at the Office of National Drug Control Policy, which is tasked with multi-billion-dollar anti-drug initiatives and curbing the opioid epidemic, was a 24-year old campaign staffer from the Trump 2016 campaign who lied on his CV and whose stepfather went to jail for manufacturing illegal drugs; after the administration was contacted about the official's qualifications and CV, the administration gave him a job with different tasks.

COVID-19 pandemic 

In 2018, before the COVID-19 pandemic, the Trump administration reorganized the Global Health Security and Biodefense unit at the NSC by merging it with other related units. Two months prior to the outbreak in Wuhan China, the Trump Administration had cut nearly $200 million in funding to Chinese research scientists studying animal coronaviruses. Throughout his presidency he also proposed budget cuts to global health. The Trump administration ignored detailed plans on how to mass-produce protective respirator masks under a program that had been launched by the Obama administration to alleviate a mask shortage for a future pandemic.

From January to mid-March 2020, Trump consistently downplayed the threat posed by COVID-19 to the United States, giving many optimistic public statements. He accused Democrats and media outlets of exaggerating the seriousness of the situation, describing Democrats' criticism of his administration's response as a "hoax". By March 2020, however, Trump had adopted a more somber tone on the matter, acknowledging for the first time that COVID-19 was "not under control". Although the CDC recommended people wear face masks in public when social distancing is not possible, Trump continually refused to wear one. He praised and encouraged protesters who violated stay-at-home orders in Democratic states, as well as praised Republican governors who violated the White House's own COVID-19 guidelines regarding re-opening their economies.

The White House Coronavirus Task Force was led by Vice President Mike Pence, Coronavirus Response Coordinator Deborah Birx, and Trump's son-in-law Jared Kushner. Congress appropriated $8.3billion in emergency funding, which Trump signed into law on March 6. During his oval office address on March 11, Trump announced an imminent travel ban between Europe and the U.S. The announcement caused chaos in European and American airports, as Americans abroad scrambled to get flights back to the U.S. The administration later had to clarify that the travel ban applied to foreigners coming from the Schengen Area, and later added Ireland and the UK to the list. Previously, in late January 2020, the administration banned travel to the U.S. from China; prior to the decision, major U.S. carriers had already announced that they would no longer fly to and from China. On March 13, Trump designated COVID-19 pandemic as a national emergency, as the number of known cases of COVID-19 in the country exceeded 1,500, while known deaths exceeded 40.

Although the U.S. government was initially quick to develop a diagnostic test for COVID-19, U.S. COVID-19 testing efforts from mid-January to late-February lost pace compared to the rest of the world. ABC News described the testing as "shockingly slow". When the WHO distributed 1.4 million COVID-19 tests in February, the U.S. chose instead to use its own tests. At that time, the CDC had produced 160,000 COVID-19 tests, but many were defective. As a result, fewer than 4,000 tests were done in the U.S. by February 27, with U.S. state laboratories conducting only about 200. In this period, academic laboratories and hospitals had developed their own tests, but were not allowed to use them until February 29, when the Food and Drug Administration issued approvals for them and private companies. A comprehensive New York Times investigation concluded that "technical flaws, regulatory hurdles, business-as-usual bureaucracies and lack of leadership at multiple levels" contributed to the testing failures. An Associated Press investigation found the administration made its first bulk orders for vital health care equipment, such as N95 respirator masks and ventilators, in mid-March.

On March 26, the U.S. became the country with the highest number of confirmed COVID-19 infections, with over 82,000 cases. On April 11, the U.S. became the country with the highest official death toll for COVID-19, with over 20,000 deaths. The HHS Inspector General released a report in April of its survey of 323 hospitals in late March; reporting severe shortages of test supplies and extended waits for results, widespread shortages of personal protective equipment (PPE), and other strained resources due to extended patient stays while awaiting test results. Trump called the IG's report "just wrong", and subsequently Trump replaced the Inspector General.

In May 2020, five months into the pandemic, Trump announced that the U.S. would withdraw from the WHO. In July 2020, Trump's Secretary of State, Mike Pompeo, formally notified the UN of U.S. decision to withdraw from the WHO, to take effect on July 6, 2021. Biden reversed Trump's decision to withdraw the U.S. from the WHO on January 20, 2021, on his first day in office.

In June 2020, amid surges in COVID-19 case numbers, Trump administration officials falsely claimed that the steep rise was due to increased testing; public health experts disputed the administration's claims, noting that the positivity rate of tests was increasing.

In October 2020, after a superspreader event at the White House, Trump announced that he and Melania Trump had tested positive for COVID-19 and would begin quarantining at the White House. Despite having the virus, Trump did not self-isolate and did not abstain from unnecessary risky behaviors. Trump was criticized for leaving his hospital room at Walter Reed National Military Medical Center to go on a joyride to greet his supporters, thus exposing United States Secret Service agents to the disease.

According to sources in the Biden administration, the Trump administration left no plan for vaccine distribution to the Biden administration, however, Anthony Fauci rejected this, stating that were "certainly not starting from scratch, because there is activity going on in the distribution," and that the new administration was improving upon existing distribution efforts. In the last quarter of 2020, Trump administration officials lobbied Congress not to provide extra funding to states for vaccine rollout, thus hindering the vaccination rollout. One of those officials, Paul Mango, the deputy chief of staff for policy at the Department of Health and Human Services, claimed that states didn't need extra money because they hadn't spent all the previously allocated money for vaccines given by the CDC.

Housing and urban policy 

In December 2017, The Economist described the Department of Housing and Urban Development (HUD), led by Carson, as "directionless". Most of the top HUD positions were unfilled and Carson's leadership was "inconspicuous and inscrutable". Of the policies HUD was enacting, The Economist wrote, "it is hard not to conclude that the governing principle at HUD is to take whatever the Obama administration was doing, and do the opposite." HUD scaled back the enforcement of fair housing laws, halted several fair housing investigations started by the Obama administration and removed the words "inclusive" and "free from discrimination" from its mission statement. The administration designated Lynne Patton, an event planner who had worked on the Trump campaign and planned Eric Trump's wedding, to lead HUD's New York and New Jersey office (which oversees billions of federal dollars).

Immigration 

Trump has repeatedly characterized illegal immigrants as criminals, although some studies have found they have lower crime and incarceration rates than native-born Americans. Prior to taking office, Trump promised to deport the estimated eleven million illegal immigrants living in the United States and to build a wall along the Mexico–U.S. border. During his presidency, Trump reduced legal immigration substantially while the illegal immigrant population remained the same. The administration took several steps to limit the rights of legal immigrants, which included attempted revocations of Temporary Protected Status for Central American refugees, 60,000 Haitians (who emigrated following the 2010 Haiti earthquake), and 200,000 Salvadorans (who emigrated following a series of devastating earthquakes in 2001) as well as making it illegal for refugees and asylum seekers, and spouses of H-1B visa holders to work in the U.S. A federal judge blocked the administration's attempt to deport the TPS recipients, citing what the judge said was Trump's racial "animus against non-white, non-European immigrants". The administration slashed refugee admissions to record low levels (since the modern program began in 1980). The administration made it harder non-citizens who served in the military to receive necessary paperwork to pursue U.S. citizenship. The administration's key legislative proposal on immigration was the 2017 RAISE Act, a proposal to reduce legal immigration levels to the U.S. by fifty percent by halving the number of green cards issued, capping refugee admissions at 50,000 a year and ending the visa diversity lottery. In 2020, the Trump administration set the lowest cap for refugees in the modern history of the United States for the subsequent year: 15,000 refugees. The administration increased fees for citizen applications, as well as caused delays in the processing of citizen applications.

By February 2018, arrests of undocumented immigrants by ICE increased by forty percent during Trump's tenure. Arrests of noncriminal undocumented immigrants were twice as high as during Obama's final year in office. Arrests of undocumented immigrants with criminal convictions increased only slightly. In 2018, experts noted that the Trump administration's immigration policies had led to an increase in criminality and lawlessness along the U.S.–Mexico border, as asylum seekers prevented by U.S. authorities from filing for asylum had been preyed upon by human smugglers, organized crime and corrupt local law enforcement. To defend administration policies on immigration, the administration fudged data and presented intentionally misleading analyses of the costs associated with refugees (omitting data that showed net positive fiscal effects), as well as created the Victims of Immigration Crime Engagement to highlight crimes committed by undocumented immigrants (there is no evidence undocumented immigrants increase the U.S. crime rate). In January 2018, Trump was widely criticized after referring to Haiti, El Salvador, and African nations in general as "shithole countries" at a bipartisan meeting on immigration. Multiple international leaders condemned his remarks as racist.

Upon taking office, Trump directed the DHS to begin work on a wall. An internal DHS report estimated Trump's wall would cost $21.6billion and take 3.5 years to build (far higher than the Trump 2016 campaign's estimate ($12billion) and the $15billion estimate from Republican congressional leaders). In a January 2017 phone call between Trump and Mexican president Enrique Peña Nieto, Trump conceded that the U.S. would pay for the border wall, not Mexico as he promised during the campaign, and implored Nieto to stop saying publicly the Mexican government would not pay for the border wall. In January 2018, the administration proposed spending $18billion over the next ten years on the wall, more than half of the $33billion spending blueprint for border security. Trump's plan would reduce funding for border surveillance, radar technology, patrol boats and customs agents; experts and officials say these are more effective at curbing illegal immigration and preventing terrorism and smuggling than a border wall.

The administration sought to add a citizenship question to the 2020 census, which experts warned would likely result in severe undercounting of the population and faulty data, with naturalized U.S. citizens, legal immigrants, and undocumented immigrants all being less likely to respond to the census. Blue states were estimated to get fewer congressional seats and lower congressional appropriations than they would otherwise get, because they have larger non-citizen populations. Thomas B. Hofeller, an architect of Republican gerrymandering, had found adding the census question would help to gerrymander maps that "would be advantageous to Republicans and non-Hispanic whites" and that Hofeller had later written the key portion of a letter from the Trump administration's Justice Department justifying the addition of a citizenship question by claiming it was needed to enforce the 1965 Voting Rights Act. In July 2019, the Supreme Court in Department of Commerce v. New York blocked the administration from including the citizenship question on the census form.

During the 2018 mid-term election campaign, Trump sent nearly 5,600 troops to the U.S.–Mexico border for the stated purpose of protecting the United States against a caravan of Central American migrants. The Pentagon had previously concluded the caravan posed no threat to the U.S. The border deployment was estimated to cost as much as $220million by the end of the year. With daily warnings from Trump about the dangers of the caravan during the mid-term election campaign, the frequency and intensity of the caravan rhetoric nearly stopped after election day.

Family separation policy 

In May 2018, the administration announced it would separate children from parents caught unlawfully crossing the southern border into the United States. Parents were routinely charged with a misdemeanor and jailed; their children were placed in separate detention centers with no established procedure to track them or reunite them with their parent after they had served time for their offence, generally only a few hours or days. Later that month, Trump falsely accused Democrats of creating that policy, despite it originating from his own administration, and urged Congress to "get together" and pass an immigration bill. Members of Congress from both parties condemned the practice and pointed out that the White House could end the separations on its own. The Washington Post quoted a White House official as saying Trump's decision to separate migrant families was to gain political leverage to force Democrats and moderate Republicans to accept hardline immigration legislation.

Six weeks into the implementation of the "zero tolerance" policy, at least 2,300 migrant children had been separated from their families. The American Academy of Pediatrics, the American College of Physicians and the American Psychiatric Association condemned the policy, with the American Academy of Pediatrics saying the policy was causing "irreparable harm" to the children. The policy was extremely unpopular, more so than any major piece of legislation in recent memory. Videos and images of children held in cage-like detention centers, distraught parents separated from their children, and sobbing children caused an outcry. After criticism, DHS secretary Kirstjen Nielsen falsely claimed that "We do not have a policy of separating families at the border."

On June 20, 2018, amid worldwide outrage and enormous political pressure to roll back his policy, Trump reversed the family-separation policy by signing an executive order, despite earlier having said "you can't do it through an executive order." Six days later, as the result of a class-action lawsuit filed by the American Civil Liberties Union, U.S. District Judge Dana Sabraw issued a nationwide preliminary injunction against the family-separation policy, and required the government to reunite separated families within 30 days. By November 2020, the parents of 666 children still had not been found. The administration has refused to provide funds to cover the expenses of reuniting families, and volunteer organizations continue to provide both volunteers and funding. The administration also refused to pay for mental health services for the families and orphaned children traumatized by the separations.

Travel bans 

In January 2017, Trump signed an executive order which indefinitely suspended admission of asylum seekers fleeing the Syrian Civil War, suspended admission of all other refugees for 120 days, and denied entry to citizens of Iraq, Iran, Libya, Somalia, Sudan, Syria and Yemen for 90 days. The order also established a religious test for refugees from Muslim nations by giving priority to refugees of other religions over Muslim refugees. Later, the administration seemed to reverse a portion of part of the order, effectively exempting visitors with a green card. After the order was challenged in the federal courts, several federal judges issued rulings enjoining the government from enforcing the order. Trump fired acting Attorney General Sally Yates after she said she would not defend the order in court; Yates was replaced by Dana Boente, who said the Department of Justice would defend the order.

A new executive order was signed in March which limited travel to the U.S. from six different countries for 90 days, and by all refugees who do not possess either a visa or valid travel documents for 120 days. The new executive order revoked and replaced the executive order issued in January.

In June, the Supreme Court partially stayed certain injunctions that were put on the order by two federal appeals courts earlier, allowing the executive order to mostly go into effect. In October, the Court dismissed the case, saying the orders had been replaced by a new proclamation, so challenges to the previous executive orders are moot.

In September, Trump signed a proclamation placing limits on the six countries in the second executive order and added Chad, North Korea, and Venezuela. In October 2017, Judge Derrick Watson, of the U.S. District Court for the District of Hawaii issued another temporary restraining order. In December 2017, the Supreme Court allowed the September 2017 travel restrictions to go into effect while legal challenges in Hawaii and Maryland are heard. The decision effectively barred most citizens of Iran, Libya, Syria, Yemen, Somalia, Chad and North Korea from entry into the United States along with some government officials from Venezuela and their families.

In January 2020, Trump added Nigeria, Myanmar, Eritrea, Kyrgyzstan, Sudan, and Tanzania to the visa ban list.

Amid the ongoing COVID-19 pandemic, Trump further restricted travel from Iran on February 29, 2020, and advised American citizens not to travel to specific regions in Italy and South Korea in response to COVID-19. In March 2020, the Trump administration later issued a ban on entrants from all Schengen Area countries, eventually including Ireland and the UK.

2018–2019 federal government shutdown 

The federal government was partially shut down from December 22, 2018, until January 25, 2019, (the longest shutdown in U.S. history) over Trump's demand that Congress provide $5.7billion in federal funds for a U.S.–Mexico border wall. The House and Senate lacked votes necessary to support his funding demand and to overcome Trump's refusal to sign the appropriations last passed by Congress into law. In negotiations with Democratic leaders leading up to the shutdown, Trump commented he would be "proud to shut down the government for border security". By mid-January 2019, the White House Council of Economic Advisors estimated that each week of the shutdown reduced GDP by 0.1 percentage points, the equivalent of 1.2 points per quarter.

In September 2020, Brian Murphywho until August 2020 was the Under Secretary of Homeland Security for Intelligence and Analysisasserted in a whistleblower complaint that during the shutdown senior DHS officials sought to inflate the number of known or suspected terrorists who had been apprehended at the border, to increase support for funding the wall. NBC News reported that in early 2019 a DHS spokeswoman, Katie Waldman, pushed the network to retract a story that correctly cited only six such apprehensions in the first half of 2018, compared to the nearly four thousand a year the administration was publicly claiming. The story was not retracted, and Waldman later became the press secretary for Vice President Pence and wife of Trump advisor Stephen Miller.

LGBT rights 

The administration rolled back numerous LGBT protections, in particular those implemented during the Obama administration, covering issues such as health care, education, employment, housing, military, and criminal justice, as well as foster care and adoption. The administration rescinded rules prohibiting taxpayer-funded adoption and foster care agencies from discriminating against LGBT adoption and foster parents. The Department of Justice reversed its position on whether the Civil Rights Act's workplace protections covered LGBT individuals and argued in state and federal courts for a constitutional right for businesses to discriminate on the basis of sexual orientation and gender identity. The administration exempted government contractors from following federal workplace discrimination rules, as long as they could cite religious reasons for doing so.

The administration rescinded a directive that public schools treat students according to their gender identity. The administration rescinded a federal policy that allowed transgender students to use bathrooms corresponding to their gender identity, and dropped a lawsuit against North Carolina's "bathroom bill". The administration rescinded rules that prohibited discrimination against LGBT patients by health care providers. Rules were rescinded to give transgender homeless people equal access to homeless shelters, and to house transgender prison inmates according to their gender identity "when appropriate". HHS stopped collecting information on LGBT participants in its national survey of older adults, and the Census Bureau removed "sexual orientation" and "gender identity" as proposed subjects for possible inclusion on the decennial census and/or American Community Survey. The Justice Department and Labor Department cancelled quarterly conference calls with LGBT organizations.

Trump said he would not allow "transgender individuals to serve in any capacity in the U.S. Military", citing disruptions and medical costs. In March 2018, he signed a Presidential Memorandum to prohibit transgender persons, whether transitioned or not, with a history or diagnosis of gender dysphoria from military service, except for individuals who have had 36 consecutive months of stability "in their biological sex before accession" and currently serving transgender persons in military service. Studies have found that allowing transgender individuals to serve in the military has "little or no impact on unit cohesion, operational effectiveness, or readiness" and that medical costs associated with transgender service members would be "minimal".

In 2017, the Treasury Department imposed sanctions on Chechen President Ramzan Kadyrov and a Chechen law enforcement official, citing anti-gay purges in Chechnya. In February 2019, the administration launched a global campaign to end the criminalization of homosexuality; the initiative was pushed by Richard Grenell, the U.S. Ambassador to Germany. Asked about the administration's campaign, Trump appeared to be unaware of it.
In February 2020, Trump appointed Grenell acting Director of National Intelligence (DNI), marking the first time in history an openly gay official served in a Cabinet Level position.

George Floyd protests 

In response to the 2020 rioting and looting amid nationwide protests against racism and police brutality after a white Minneapolis Police Department officer murdered an African American man named George Floyd, Trump tweeted a quote, "when the looting starts, the shooting starts", coined in 1967 by a Miami police chief that has been widely condemned by civil rights groups. Trump later addressed protestors outside the White House by saying they "would have been greeted with the most vicious dogs, and most ominous weapons, I have ever seen" if they breached the White House fence.

Photo-op at St. John's Episcopal Church 

On June 1, 2020, hundreds of police officers, members of the National Guard and other forces, in riot gear used smoke canisters, rubber bullets, batons and shields to disperse a crowd of peaceful protesters outside St. John's Episcopal Church across Lafayette Square from the White House. A news crew from Australia was attacked by these forces and clergy on the church's porch suffered effects of the gas and were dispersed along with the others. Trump, accompanied by other officials including the Secretary of Defense, then walked across Lafayette Square and posed for pictures while he was holding a Bible up for the cameras, outside the church which had suffered minor damage from a fire started by arsonists the night before. Mariann Edgar Budde, Bishop of the Episcopal Diocese of Washington said she was "outraged" by Trump's actions, which also received widespread condemnation from other religious leaders. However, the reaction from the religious right and evangelicals generally praised the visit.

Deployment of federal law enforcement to cities 

In July 2020, federal forces were deployed to Portland, Oregon, in response to rioting during protests against police brutality, which had resulted in vandalism to the city's federal courthouse. The Department of Homeland Security cited Trump's June 26 executive order to protect statues and monuments as allowing federal officers to be deployed without the permission of individual states. Federal agents fired pepper spray or tear gas at protesters who got too close to the U.S. courthouse. The heavily armed officers were dressed in military camouflage uniforms (without identification) and used unmarked vans to arrest protestors, some of whom were nowhere near the federal courthouse.

The presence and tactics of the officers drew widespread condemnation. Oregon officials including the governor, the mayor of Portland, and multiple members of Congress asked the DHS to remove federal agents from the city. The mayor said the officers were causing violence and "we do not need or want their help." Multiple Congressional committees asked for an investigation, saying "Citizens are concerned that the Administration has deployed a secret police force." Lawsuits against the administration were filed by the American Civil Liberties Union and the Attorney General of Oregon. The inspectors general for the Justice Department and Homeland Security announced investigations into the deployment.

Trump said he was pleased with the way things were going in Portland and said that he might send federal law enforcement to many more cities, including New York, Chicago, Philadelphia, Detroit, Baltimore, and Oakland"all run by liberal Democrats". Albuquerque and Milwaukee were also named as potential targets.

Under a deal worked out between Governor Kate Brown and the Trump administration, federal agents withdrew to standby locations on July 30, while state and local law enforcement forces took over responsibility for protecting the courthouse; they made no arrests and mostly stayed out of sight. Protests that night were peaceful. A DHS spokesperson said federal officers would remain in the area at least until the following Monday.

Science 

The administration marginalized the role of science in policymaking, halted numerous research projects, and saw the departure of scientists who said their work was marginalized or suppressed. In 2018, 19 months after Trump took office, meteorologist Kelvin Droegemeier became the Science Advisor to the President; this was the longest period without a science advisor since the 1976 administration. While preparing for talks with Kim Jong-un, the White House did not do so with the assistance of a White House science adviser or senior counselor trained in nuclear physics. The position of chief scientist in the State Department or the Department of Agriculture was not filled. The administration nominated Sam Clovis to be chief scientist in the U.S. Department of Agriculture, but he had no scientific background and the White House later withdrew the nomination. The administration successfully nominated Jim Bridenstine, who had no background in science and rejected the scientific consensus on climate change, to lead NASA. The U.S. Department of the Interior, the National Oceanic and Atmospheric Administration, and the Food and Drug Administration (FDA) disbanded advisory committees, while the Department of Energy prohibited use of the term "climate change". In March 2020, The New York Times reported that an official at the Interior Department has repeatedly inserted climate change-denying language into the agency's scientific reports, such as those that affect water and mineral rights.

During the 2020 COVID-19 pandemic, the Trump administration replaced career public affairs staff at the Department of Health and Human Services with political appointees, including Michael Caputo, who interfered with weekly Centers for Disease Control scientific reports and attempted to silence the government's most senior infectious disease expert, Anthony Fauci, "sowing distrust of the FDA at a time when health leaders desperately need people to accept a vaccine in order to create the immunity necessary to defeat the novel coronavirus". One day after Trump noted that he might dismiss an FDA proposal to improve standards for emergency use of a COVID-19 vaccine, the presidents of the National Academies of Sciences and Medicine issued a statement expressing alarm at political interference in science during a pandemic, "particularly the overriding of evidence and advice from public health officials and derision of government scientists".

Space 

NASA began the Artemis program in December 2017, with its initial focus on returning humans to the Moon for commercial mining and research, aiming to secure the leading position in the emerging commercial space race. Trump also promoted the United States Space Force. On December 20, 2019, the Space Force Act, developed by Democratic Representative Jim Cooper and Republican Representative Mike Rogers, was signed as part of the National Defense Authorization Act. The act reorganized the Air Force Space Command into the United States Space Force, and created the first new independent military service since the Army Air Forces were reorganized as the U.S. Air Force in 1947.

Surveillance 
In 2019, Trump signed into law a six-year extension of Section 702 of the Foreign Intelligence Surveillance Act, allowing the NSA to conduct searches of foreigners' communications without any warrant. The process incidentally collects information from Americans.

Veterans affairs 
Prior to David Shulkin's firing in April 2018, The New York Times described the U.S. Department of Veterans Affairs (VA) as a "rare spot of calm in the Trump administration". Shulkin built upon changes started under the Obama administration to do a long-term overhaul of the VA system. In May 2018, legislation to increase veterans' access to private care was stalled, as was a VA overhaul which sought to synchronize medical records. In May 2018, there were reports of a large number of resignations of senior staffers and a major re-shuffling.

In August 2018, ProPublica reported that three wealthy patrons of Trump's Mar-a-Lago club, formed an "informal council" that strongly influenced VA policy, including reviewing a confidential $10billion contract to modernize the VA's records. The Government Accountability Office announced in November 2018 that it would investigate the matter.

In 2018, Trump signed into law the VA MISSION Act, which expanded eligibility for the Veterans Choice program, allowing veterans greater access to private sector healthcare. Trump falsely asserted more than 150 times that he created the Veterans Choice program, which has in fact existed since being signed into law by president Obama in 2014.

Voting rights 

Under the Trump administration, the Justice Department limited enforcement actions to protect voting rights, and in fact often defended restrictions on voting rights imposed by various states that have been challenged as voter suppression. The Justice Department under Trump has filed only a single new case under the Voting Rights Act of 1965. Trump's Justice Department opposed minority voters' interests in all of the major voting litigation since 2017 in which the Justice Department Civil Rights Division Voting Section has been involved.

Trump has repeatedly alleged, without evidence, there was widespread voter fraud. The administration created a commission with the stated purpose to review the extent of voter fraud in the wake of Trump's false claim that millions of unauthorized votes cost him the popular vote in the 2016 election. It was chaired by Vice President Pence, while the day-to-day administrator was Kris Kobach, best known for promoting restrictions on access to voting. The commission began its work by requesting each state to turn over detailed information about all registered voters in their database. Most states rejected the request, citing privacy concerns or state laws. Multiple lawsuits were filed against the commission. Maine Secretary of State Matthew Dunlap said Kobach was refusing to share working documents and scheduling information with him and the other Democrats on the commission. A federal judge ordered the commission to hand over the documents. Shortly thereafter, Trump disbanded the commission, and informed Dunlap that it would not obey the court order to provide the documents because the commission no longer existed. Election integrity experts argued that the commission was disbanded because of the lawsuits, which would have led to greater transparency and accountability and thus prevented the Republican members of the commission from producing a sham report to justify restrictions on voting rights. It was later revealed the commission had, in its requests for Texas voter data, specifically asked for data that identifies voters with Hispanic surnames.

White nationalists and Charlottesville rally 

On August 13, 2017, Trump condemned violence "on many sides" after a gathering of hundreds of white nationalists in Charlottesville, Virginia, the previous day (August 12) turned deadly. A white supremacist drove a car into a crowd of counter-protesters, killing one woman and injuring 19 others. According to Sessions, that action met the definition of domestic terrorism. During the rally there had been other violence, as some counter-protesters charged at the white nationalists with swinging clubs and mace, throwing bottles, rocks, and paint. Trump did not expressly mention Neo-Nazis, white supremacists, or the alt-right movement in his remarks on August 13, but the following day condemned "the KKK, neo-Nazis, white supremacists, and other hate groups". On August 15, he again blamed "both sides".

Many Republican and Democratic elected officials condemned the violence and hatred of white nationalists, neo-Nazis and alt-right activists. Trump came under criticism from world leaders and politicians, as well as a variety of religious groups and anti-hate organizations for his remarks, which were seen as muted and equivocal. The New York Times reported Trump "was the only national political figure to spread blame for the 'hatred, bigotry and violence' that resulted in the death of one person to 'many sides'", and said Trump had "buoyed the white nationalist movement on Tuesday as no president has done in generations".

Foreign affairs 

The foreign policy positions expressed by Trump during his presidential campaign changed frequently, so it was "difficult to glean a political agenda, or even a set of clear, core policy values ahead of his presidency". Under a banner of "America First", the Trump administration distinguished itself from past administrations with frequent open admiration of authoritarian rulers and rhetorical rejections of key human rights norms.

Despite pledges to reduce the number of active duty U.S. military personnel deployed overseas, the number was essentially the same three years into Trump's presidency as they were at the end of Obama's.

On October 27, 2019, ISIS leader Abu Bakr al-Baghdadi killed himself and three children by detonating a suicide vest during the Barisha raid conducted by the U.S. Delta Force in Syria's northwestern Idlib Province.

Trump withdrew from the Open Skies Treaty, a nearly three-decade old agreement promoting transparency of military forces and activities.

Defense 

As a candidate and as president, Trump called for a major build-up of American military capabilities. Trump announced in October 2018 that the United States would withdraw from the Intermediate-Range Nuclear Forces Treaty with Russia. The goal was to enable the United States to counter increasing Chinese intermediate nuclear missile capabilities in the Pacific. In December 2018, Trump complained about the amount the United States spends on an "uncontrollable arms race" with Russia and China. Trump said that the $716billion which the United States was spending on the "arms race" was "Crazy!". He had previously praised his own increased defense spending, five months earlier. The total fiscal 2019 defense budget authorization was $716billion, although missile defense and nuclear programs made up about $10billion of the total.

During 2018, Trump falsely asserted that he had secured the largest defense budget authorization ever, the first military pay raise in ten years, and that military spending was at least 4.0% of GDP, "which got a lot bigger since I became your president".

Controversy arose in November 2019 after Trump pardoned or promoted three soldiers accused or convicted of war crimes. The most prominent case involved Eddie Gallagher, a Navy SEAL team chief who had been reported to Navy authorities by his own team members for sniping at an unarmed civilian girl and an elderly man. Gallagher faced court martial for the murder of a wounded teenage combatant, among other charges. The medic of his SEAL team was granted immunity to testify against him, but on the witness stand the medic reversed what he had previously told investigators and testified that he himself had murdered the teenage combatant. Gallagher was subsequently acquitted of the murder charge against him, and the Navy demoted him to the lowest possible rank due to his conviction on another charge. The Navy later moved to strip Gallagher of his Trident pin and to eject him from the Navy. Trump intervened to restore Gallagher's rank and pin. Many military officers were enraged by Trump's intervention, as they felt it disrupted principles of military discipline and justice. Secretary of the Navy Richard Spencer protested Trump's intervention and was forced to resign; in his resignation letter, he sharply rebuked Trump for his judgment in the matter. Trump told a rally audience days later, "I stuck up for three great warriors against the deep state."

The Trump administration sharply increased the frequency of drone strikes compared to the preceding Obama administration, in countries such as Afghanistan, Iraq, Somalia, Syria and Yemen, rollbacked transparency in reporting drone strike deaths, and reduced accountability. In March 2019, Trump ended the Obama policy of reporting the number of civilian deaths caused by U.S. drone strikes, claiming that this policy was unnecessary.

Afghanistan 

The number of U.S. troops deployed to Afghanistan decreased significantly during Trump's presidency. By the end of Trump's term in office troop levels in Afghanistan were at the lowest levels since the early days of the war in 2001. Trump's presidency saw an expansion of drone warfare and a massive increase in civilian casualties from airstrikes in Afghanistan relative to the Obama administration.

In February 2020, the Trump administration signed a deal with the Taliban, which if upheld by the Taliban, would result in the withdrawal of United States troops from Afghanistan by May 2021 (Trump's successor Joe Biden later extended the deadline to September 2021). As part of the deal, the U.S. agreed to the release of 5,000 Taliban members who were imprisoned by the Afghan government; some of these ex-prisoners went on to join the 2021 Taliban offensive that felled the Afghan government.

In 2020, US casualties in Afghanistan reached their lowest level for the entire war. In Iraq, casualties increased, being significantly higher in Trump's term than Obama's second term.

Following the collapse of the Afghan government and the fall of Kabul in August 2021, accusations by Olivia Troye surfaced on Twitter of the Trump Administration deliberately obstructing the visa process for Afghans who had helped U.S. efforts in Afghanistan.

China 

On January 19, 2021, Secretary of State Mike Pompeo announced that the Department of State had determined that "genocide and crimes against humanity" had been perpetrated by China against the Uyghur Muslims and other ethnic minorities in Xinjiang. The announcement was made on the last day of Trump's presidency. The incoming president, Joe Biden, had already declared during his presidential campaign, that such a determination should be made. On January 20, 2021, Pompeo along with other Trump administration officials were sanctioned by China.

Cuba

North Korea 

After initially adopting a verbally hostile posture toward North Korea and its leader, Kim Jong-un, Trump quickly pivoted to embrace the regime, saying he and Kim "fell in love". Trump engaged Kim by meeting him at two summits, in June 2018 and February 2019, an unprecedented move by an American president, as previous policy had been that a president's simply meeting with the North Korean leader would legitimize the regime on the world stage. During the June 2018 summit, the leaders signed a vague agreement to pursue denuclearization of the Korean peninsula, with Trump immediately declaring "There is no longer a Nuclear Threat from North Korea." Little progress was made toward that goal during the months before the February 2019 summit, which ended abruptly without an agreement, hours after the White House announced a signing ceremony was imminent. During the months between the summits, a growing body of evidence indicated North Korea was continuing its nuclear fuel, bomb and missile development, including by redeveloping an ICBM site it was previously appearing to dismantleeven while the second summit was underway. In the aftermath of the February 2019 failed summit, the Treasury department imposed additional sanctions on North Korea. The following day, Trump tweeted, "It was announced today by the U.S. Treasury that additional large scale Sanctions would be added to those already existing Sanctions on North Korea. I have today ordered the withdrawal of those additional Sanctions!" On December 31, 2019, the Korean Central News Agency announced that Kim had abandoned his moratoriums on nuclear and intercontinental ballistic missile tests, quoting Kim as saying, "the world will witness a new strategic weapon to be possessed by the DPRK in the near future." Two years after the Singapore summit, the North Korean nuclear arsenal had significantly expanded.

During a June 2019 visit to South Korea, Trump visited the Korean Demilitarized Zone and invited North Korean leader Kim Jong-un to meet him there, which he did, and Trump became the first sitting president to step inside North Korea.

Turkey 

In October 2019, after Trump spoke to Turkish president Recep Tayyip Erdoğan, the White House acknowledged that Turkey would be carrying out a planned military offensive into northern Syria; as such, U.S. troops in northern Syria were withdrawn from the area to avoid interference with that operation. The statement also passed responsibility for the area's captured ISIS fighters to Turkey. Congress members of both parties denounced the move, including Republican allies of Trump like Senator Lindsey Graham. They argued that the move betrayed the American-allied Kurds, and would benefit ISIS, Russia, Iran and Bashar al-Assad's Syrian regime. Trump defended the move, citing the high cost of supporting the Kurds, and the lack of support from the Kurds in past U.S. wars. Within a week of the U.S. pullout, Turkey proceeded to attack Kurdish-controlled areas in northeast Syria. Kurdish forces then announced an alliance with the Syrian government and its Russian allies, in a united effort to repel Turkey.

Iran 

In 2020, the Trump administration asserted that the U.S. remained a "participant" in the Iran Deal, despite having formally withdrawn in 2018, to persuade the United Nations Security Council to reimpose pre-agreement sanctions on Iran for its breaches of the deal after the U.S. withdrawal. The agreement provided for a resolution process among signatories in the event of a breach, but that process had not yet played out. The Security Council voted on the administration's proposal in August, with only the Dominican Republic joining the U.S. to vote in favor.

Saudi Arabia 

Trump actively supported the Saudi Arabian-led intervention in Yemen against the Houthis. Trump also praised his relationship with Saudi Arabia's powerful Crown Prince Mohammad bin Salman. On May 20, 2017, Trump and Saudi Arabia's King Salman bin Abdulaziz Al Saud signed a series of letters of intent for the Kingdom of Saudi Arabia to purchase arms from the United States totaling $110billion immediately, and $350billion over ten years. The transfer was widely seen as a counterbalance against the influence of Iran in the region and a "significant" and "historic" expansion of United States relations with Saudi Arabia. By July 2019, two of Trump's three vetoes were to overturn bipartisan congressional action related to Saudi Arabia.

In October 2018, amid widespread condemnation of Saudi Arabia for the murder of prominent Saudi journalist and dissident Jamal Khashoggi, the Trump administration pushed back on the condemnation. After the CIA assessed that Saudi Crown Prince Mohammad bin Salman ordered the murder of Khashoggi, Trump rejected the assessment and said the CIA only had "feelings" on the matter.

Israel / Palestine 

Since the Six Day War in 1967, the United States had considered Israeli settlements in the occupied West Bank to be "illegitimate". This status changed in November 2019 when the Trump administration shifted U.S. policy and declared "the establishment of Israeli civilian settlements in the West Bank is not per se inconsistent with international law."

Trump unveiled his own peace plan to resolve the Israeli–Palestinian conflict on January 28, 2020. His first official diplomatic success was realized in August 2020 with the first of the Abraham Accords, when Israel and the United Arab Emirates agreed to begin normalizing relations in an agreement brokered by Jared Kushner. The following month, Israel and Bahrain agreed to normalize diplomatic relations in another deal mediated and brokered by the Trump administration. A month later, Israel and Sudan agreed to normalize relations in a third such agreement in as many months. On December 10, 2020, Trump announced that Israel and Morocco had agreed to establish full diplomatic relations, while also announcing that the United States recognized Morocco's claim over the disputed territory of Western Sahara.

United Arab Emirates 

As Donald Trump lost the election bid against Joe Biden, the U.S. State Department notified Congress about its plans to sell 18 sophisticated armed MQ-9B aerial drones to the United Arab Emirates, under a deal worth $2.9 billion. The drones were expected to be equipped with maritime radar, and the delivery was being estimated by 2024. Besides, another informal notification was sent to the Congress regarding the plans of providing the UAE with $10 billion of defense equipment, including precision-guided munitions, non-precision bombs and missiles.

Russia and related investigations 

American intelligence sources found the Russian government attempted to intervene in the 2016 presidential election to favor the election of Trump, and that members of Trump's campaign were in contact with Russian government officials both before and after the election. In May 2017, the Department of Justice appointed Robert Mueller as special counsel to investigate "any links and/or coordination between Russian government and individuals associated with the campaign of President Donald Trump, and any matters that arose or may arise directly from the investigation".

During his January 2017 confirmation hearings as the attorney general nominee before the Senate, then-Senator Jeff Sessions appeared to deliberately omit two meetings he had in 2016 with Russian Ambassador Sergey Kislyak, when asked if he had meetings involving the 2016 election with Russian government officials. Sessions later amended his testimony saying he "never met with any Russian officials to discuss issues of the campaign". Following his amended statement, Sessions recused himself from any investigation regarding connections between Trump and Russia.

In May 2017, Trump discussed highly classified intelligence in an Oval Office meeting with the Russian foreign minister Sergey Lavrov and ambassador Sergey Kislyak, providing details that could expose the source of the information and how it was collected. A Middle Eastern ally provided the intelligence which had the highest level of classification and was not intended to be shared widely. The New York Times reported, "sharing the information without the express permission of the ally who provided it was a major breach of espionage etiquette, and could jeopardize a crucial intelligence-sharing relationship." The White House, through National Security Advisor H. R. McMaster, issued a limited denial, saying the story "as reported" was incorrect and that no "intelligence sources or methods" were discussed. McMaster did not deny that information had been disclosed. The following day Trump said on Twitter that Russia is an important ally against terrorism and that he had an "absolute right" to share classified information with Russia. Soon after the meeting, American intelligence extracted a high-level covert source from within the Russian government, on concerns the individual could be at risk due, in part, to Trump and his administration repeatedly mishandling classified intelligence.

In October 2017, former Trump campaign advisor George Papadopoulos pleaded guilty to one count of making false statements to the FBI regarding his contacts with Russian agents. During the campaign he had tried repeatedly but unsuccessfully to set up meetings in Russia between Trump campaign representatives and Russian officials.

Trump went to great lengths to keep details of his private conversations with Russian president Putin secret, including in one case by retaining his interpreter's notes and instructing the linguist to not share the contents of the discussions with anyone in the administration. As a result, there were no detailed records, even in classified files, of Trump's conversations with Putin on five occasions.

Of Trump's campaign advisors and staff, six of them were indicted by the special counsel's office; five of them (Michael Cohen, Michael Flynn, Rick Gates, Paul Manafort, George Papadopoulos) pleaded guilty, while one has pleaded not guilty (Roger Stone). As of December 2020, Stone, Papadopoulos, Manafort, and Flynn have been pardoned by Trump, but not Cohen or Gates.

On June 12, 2019, Trump asserted he saw nothing wrong in accepting intelligence on his political adversaries from foreign powers, such as Russia, and he could see no reason to contact the FBI about it. Responding to a reporter who told him FBI director Christopher Wray had said such activities should be reported to the FBI, Trump said, "the FBI director is wrong." Trump elaborated, "there's nothing wrong with listening. If somebody called from a country, Norway, 'we have information on your opponent'oh, I think I'd want to hear it." Both Democrats and Republicans repudiated the remarks.

The New York Times reported in June 2021 that in 2017 and 2018 the Justice Department subpoenaed metadata from the iCloud accounts of at least a dozen individuals associated with the House Intelligence Committee, including that of Democrat ranking member Adam Schiff and Eric Swalwell, and family members, to investigate leaks to the press about contacts between Trump associates and Russia. Records of the inquiry did not implicate anyone associated with the committee, but upon becoming attorney general Bill Barr revived the effort, including by appointing a federal prosecutor and about six others in February 2020. The Times reported that, apart from corruption investigations, subpoenaing communications information of members of Congress is nearly unheard-of, and that some in the Justice Department saw Barr's approach as politically motivated. Justice Department Inspector General Michael Horowitz announced an inquiry into the matter the day after the Times report.

Special counsel's report 
In February 2018, when Mueller indicted more than a dozen Russians and three entities for interference in the 2016 election, Trump asserted the indictment was proof his campaign did not collude with the Russians. The New York Times noted Trump "voiced no concern that a foreign power had been trying for nearly four years to upend American democracy, much less resolve to stop it from continuing to do so this year".

In July 2018, the special counsel indicted twelve Russian intelligence operatives and accused them of conspiring to interfere in the 2016 U.S. elections, by hacking servers and emails of the Democratic Party and the Hillary Clinton 2016 presidential campaign. The indictments were made before Trump's meeting with Putin in Helsinki, in which Trump supported Putin's denial that Russia was involved and criticized American law enforcement and intelligence community (subsequently Trump partially walked back some of his comments). A few days later, it was reported that Trump had actually been briefed on the veracity and extent of Russian cyber-attacks two weeks before his inauguration, back in December 2016, including the fact that these were ordered by Putin himself. The evidence presented to him at the time included text and email conversations between Russian military officers as well as information from a source close to Putin.

On March 22, 2019, Mueller submitted the final report to Attorney General William Barr. Two days later, Barr sent Congress a four-page letter, describing what he said were the special counsel's principal conclusions in the report. Barr added that, since the special counsel "did not draw a conclusion" on obstruction, this "leaves it to the Attorney General to determine whether the conduct described in the report constitutes a crime". Barr continued: "Deputy Attorney General Rod Rosenstein and I have concluded that the evidence developed during the Special Counsel's investigation is not sufficient to establish that the President committed an obstruction-of-justice offense."

On April 18, 2019, a two-volume redacted version of the special counsel's report titled Report on the Investigation into Russian interference in the 2016 Presidential Election was released to Congress and to the public. About one-eighth of the lines in the public version were redacted.

Volume I discusses about Russian interference in the 2016 presidential election, concluding that interference occurred "in sweeping and systematic fashion" and "violated U.S. criminal law". The report detailed activities by the Internet Research Agency, a Kremlin-linked Russian troll farm, to create a "social media campaign that favored presidential candidate Donald J. Trump and disparaged presidential candidate Hillary Clinton", and to "provoke and amplify political and social discord in the United States". The report also described how the Russian intelligence service, the GRU, performed computer hacking and strategic releasing of damaging material from the Clinton campaign and Democratic Party organizations. To establish whether a crime was committed by members of the Trump campaign with regard to Russian interference, investigators used the legal standard for criminal conspiracy rather than the popular concept of "collusion", because a crime of "collusion" is not found in criminal law or the United States Code.

According to the report, the investigation "identified numerous links between the Russian government and the Trump campaign", and found that Russia had "perceived it would benefit from a Trump presidency" and the 2016 Trump presidential campaign "expected it would benefit electorally" from Russian hacking efforts. Ultimately, "the investigation did not establish that members of the Trump campaign conspired or coordinated with the Russian government in its election interference activities." However, investigators had an incomplete picture of what had really occurred during the 2016 campaign, due to some associates of the Trump campaign providing false or incomplete testimony, exercising the privilege against self-incrimination, and having deleted, unsaved, or encrypted communications. As such, the Mueller report "cannot rule out the possibility" that information then unavailable to investigators would have presented different findings.

Volume II covered obstruction of justice. The report described ten episodes where Trump may have obstructed justice as president, plus one instance before he was elected. The report said that in addition to Trump's public attacks on the investigation and its subjects, he had also privately tried to "control the investigation" in multiple ways, but mostly failed to influence it because his subordinates or associates refused to carry out his instructions. For that reason, no charges against the Trump's aides and associates were recommended "beyond those already filed". The special counsel could not charge Trump himself once investigators decided to abide by an Office of Legal Counsel (OLC) opinion that a sitting president cannot stand trial, and they feared charges would affect Trump's governing and possibly preempt his impeachment. In addition, investigators felt it would be unfair to accuse Trump of a crime without charges and without a trial in which he could clear his name, hence investigators "determined not to apply an approach that could potentially result in a judgment that the President committed crimes".

Since the special counsel's office had decided "not to make a traditional prosecutorial judgment" on whether to "initiate or decline a prosecution", they "did not draw ultimate conclusions about the President's conduct". The report "does not conclude that the president committed a crime", but specifically did not exonerate Trump on obstruction of justice, because investigators were not confident that Trump was innocent after examining his intent and actions. The report concluded "that Congress has authority to prohibit a President's corrupt use of his authority in order to protect the integrity of the administration of justice" and "that Congress may apply the obstruction laws to the president's corrupt exercise of the powers of office accords with our constitutional system of checks and balances and the principle that no person is above the law".

On May 1, 2019, following publication of the special counsel's report, Barr testified before the Senate Judiciary Committee, during which Barr said he "didn't exonerate" Trump on obstruction as that was not the role of the Justice Department. He declined to testify before the House Judiciary Committee the following day because he objected to the committee's plan to use staff lawyers during questioning. Barr also repeatedly failed to give the unredacted special counsel's report to the Judiciary Committee by its deadline of May 6, 2019. On May 8, 2019, the committee voted to hold Barr in contempt of Congress, which refers the matter to entire House for resolution. Concurrently, Trump asserted executive privilege via the Department of Justice in an effort to prevent the redacted portions of the special counsel's report and the underlying evidence from being disclosed. Committee chairman Jerry Nadler said the U.S. is in a constitutional crisis, "because the President is disobeying the law, is refusing all information to Congress". Speaker Nancy Pelosi said Trump was "self-impeaching" by stonewalling Congress.

Following release of the Mueller report, Trump and his allies turned their attention toward "investigating the investigators". On May 23, 2019, Trump ordered the intelligence community to cooperate with Barr's investigation of the origins of the investigation, granting Barr full authority to declassify any intelligence information related to the matter. Some analysts expressed concerns that the order could create a conflict between the Justice Department and the intelligence community over closely guarded intelligence sources and methods, as well as open the possibility Barr could cherrypick intelligence for public release to help Trump.

Upon announcing the formal closure of the investigation and his resignation from the Justice Department on May 29, Mueller said, "If we had had confidence that the president clearly did not commit a crime, we would have said so. We did not, however, decide as to whether the president did commit a crime." During his testimony to Congress on July 24, 2019, Mueller said that a president could be charged with obstruction of justice (or other crimes) after the president left office.

Counter-investigations 

Amid accusations by Trump and his supporters that he had been subjected to an illegitimate investigation, in May 2019, Barr appointed federal prosecutor John Durham to review the origins of the Crossfire Hurricane investigation. By September 2020, Durham's inquiry had expanded to include the FBI's investigation of the Clinton Foundation during the 2016 campaign.

In November 2017, Sessions appointed U.S. Attorney John Huber to investigate the FBI's surveillance of Carter Page and connections between the Clinton Foundation and Uranium One, starting in November 2017. The investigation ended in January 2020 after no evidence was found to warrant the opening of a criminal investigation. Special Counsel Robert Mueller's April 2019 report documented that Trump pressured Sessions and the Department of Justice to re-open the investigation into Clinton's emails.

Ethics 

The Trump administration has been characterized by a departure from ethical norms. Unlike previous administrations of both parties, the Trump White House has not observed a strict boundary between official government activities and personal, political, or campaign activities.

Role of lobbyists 
During the 2016 campaign, Trump promised to "drain the swamp"a phrase that usually refers to entrenched corruption and lobbying in Washington, D.C.and he proposed a series of ethics reforms. However, according to federal records and interviews, there has been a dramatic increase in lobbying by corporations and hired interests during Trump's tenure, particularly through Pence's office. About twice as many lobbying firms contacted Pence, compared to previous presidencies, among them representatives of major energy firms and drug companies. In many cases, the lobbyists have charged their clients millions of dollars for access to the vice president, and then have turned around and donated the money to Pence's political causes.

Among the administration's first policies was a five-year ban on serving as a lobbyist after working in the executive branch. However, as one of his final acts of office, Trump rolled back that policy, thus allowing administration staff to work as lobbyists.

A number of former Trump associates, fundraisers and aides had faced criminal charges. In July 2021, one of his high-profile associates and a close friend, Thomas J. Barrack Jr. was arrested on federal charges for acting as an unregistered foreign lobbyist, obstructing justice and giving false statements to the FBI. The 74-year-old private equity investor was accused in a nine-count indictment of illegally lobbying and exerting influence over Trump on behalf of the United Arab Emirates. Federal prosecutors said Barrack had to complete the "wish list" given by the Emirati officials, stating what foreign policy changes they expected from the US. A former top executive at Barrack's firm, Matthew Grimes, and an Emirati businessman, Rashid al-Malik, also faced federal charges of acting as Emirati agents without registering with the Justice Department. Barrack pleaded not guilty and was released from custody after posting $250 million bail with a cash security of $5 million. Barrack and Grimes were found not guilty on all charges in November 2022.

Potential conflicts of interest 

Trump's presidency has been marked by significant public concern about conflict of interest stemming from his diverse business ventures. In the lead up to his inauguration, Trump promised to remove himself from the day-to-day operations of his businesses. Trump placed his sons Eric Trump and Donald Trump Jr. at the head of his businesses claiming they would not communicate with him regarding his interests. However, critics noted that this would not prevent him from having input into his businesses and knowing how to benefit himself, and Trump continued to receive quarterly updates on his businesses. As his presidency progressed, he failed to take steps or show interest in further distancing himself from his business interests resulting in numerous potential conflicts. Ethics experts found Trump's plan to address conflicts of interest between his position as president and his private business interests to be entirely inadequate. Unlike every other president in the last 40 years, Trump did not put his business interests in a blind trust or equivalent arrangement "to cleanly sever himself from his business interests". In January 2018, a year into his presidency, Trump owned stakes in hundreds of businesses.

After Trump took office, the watchdog group Citizens for Responsibility and Ethics in Washington, represented by a number of constitutional scholars, sued him for violations of the Foreign Emoluments Clause (a constitutional provision that bars the president or any other federal official from taking gifts or payments from foreign governments), because his hotels and other businesses accept payment from foreign governments. CREW separately filed a complaint with the General Services Administration (GSA) over Trump International Hotel Washington, D.C.; the 2013 lease that Trump and the GSA signed "explicitly forbids any elected government official from holding the lease or benefiting from it". The GSA said it was "reviewing the situation". By May 2017, the CREW v. Trump lawsuit had grown with additional plaintiffs and alleged violations of the Domestic Emoluments Clause. In June 2017, attorneys from the Department of Justice filed a motion to dismiss the case on the grounds that the plaintiffs had no right to sue and that the described conduct was not illegal. Also in June 2017, two more lawsuits were filed based on the Foreign Emoluments Clause: D.C. and Maryland v. Trump, and Blumenthal v. Trump, which was signed by more than one-third of the voting members of Congress. United States District Judge George B. Daniels dismissed the CREW case on December 21, 2017, holding that plaintiffs lacked standing. D.C. and Maryland v. Trump cleared three judicial hurdles to proceed to the discovery phase during 2018, with prosecutors issuing 38 subpoenas to Trump's businesses and cabinet departments in December before the Fourth Circuit Court of Appeals issued a stay days later at the behest of the Justice Department, pending hearings in March 2019. NBC News reported that by June 2019 representatives of 22 governments had spent money at Trump properties. In January 2021, the U.S. Supreme Court dismissed the lawsuits as Trump was no longer president.

Saudi Arabia 

In March 2018, The New York Times reported that George Nader had turned Trump's major fundraiser Elliott Broidy "into an instrument of influence at the White House for the rulers of Saudi Arabia and the United Arab Emirates... High on the agenda of the two men... was pushing the White House to remove Secretary of State Rex W. Tillerson," a top defender of the Iran nuclear deal in Donald Trump's administration, and "backing confrontational approaches to Iran and Qatar".

Transparency, data availability, and record keeping 
The Washington Post reported in May 2017, "a wide variety of information that until recently was provided to the public, limiting access, for instance, to disclosures about workplace violations, energy efficiency, and animal welfare abuses" had been removed or tucked away. The Obama administration had used the publication of enforcement actions taken by federal agencies against companies as a way to name and shame companies that engaged in unethical and illegal behaviors.

The Trump administration stopped the longstanding practice of logging visitors to the White House, making it difficult to tell who has visited the White House. In July 2018, CNN reported that the White House had suspended the practice of publishing public summaries of Trump's phone calls with world leaders, bringing an end to a common exercise from previous administrations.

Trump refused to follow the rules of the Presidential Records Act, which requires presidents and their administrations to preserve all official documents and turn them over to the National Archives. Trump habitually tore up papers after reading them, and White House staffers were assigned to collect the scraps and tape them back together for the archives. He also took boxes of documents and other items with him when he left the White House; the National Archives later retrieved them. Some of the documents he took with him were discovered to be classified, including some at the "top secret" level. Trump sometimes used his personal cellphone to converse with world leaders so that there would be no record of the conversation. By May 2022, federal prosecutors had empaneled a grand jury to investigate possible mishandling of documents by Trump and other officials in his White House.

Hatch Act violations 
In the first three and a half years of Trump's term, the Office of Special Counsel, an independent federal government ethics agency, found 13 senior Trump administration officials in violation of the Hatch Act of 1939, which restricts the government employees' involvement in politics; 11 of the complaints were filed by the activist group Citizens for Responsibility and Ethics in Washington (CREW). By comparison, CREW stated that it was aware of only two findings of Hatch Act violations during the eight years of the Obama administration.

Henry Kerner, head of the Office of Special Counsel, found in a report released in November 2021 that at least thirteen administration officials demonstrated "willful disregard" for the Hatch Act, including "especially pernicious" behavior in the days before the 2020 election.

Security clearances 
In March 2019, Tricia Newbold, a White House employee working on security clearances, privately told the House Oversight Committee that at least 25 Trump administration officials had been granted security clearances over the objections of career staffers. Newbold also asserted that some of these officials had previously had their applications rejected for "disqualifying issues", only for those rejections to be overturned with inadequate explanation.

After the House Oversight Committee subpoenaed former head of White House security clearances Carl Kline to give testimony, the administration instructed Kline not to comply with the subpoena, asserting that the subpoena "unconstitutionally encroaches on fundamental executive branch interests". Kline eventually gave closed-door testimony before the committee in May 2019, but House Democrats said he did not "provide specific details to their questions".

Impeachment inquiry 

On August 12, 2019, an unnamed intelligence official privately filed a whistleblower complaint with Michael Atkinson, the Inspector General of the Intelligence Community (ICIG), under the provisions of the Intelligence Community Whistleblower Protection Act (ICWPA). The whistleblower alleged that Trump had abused his office in soliciting foreign interference to improve his own electoral chances in 2020. The complaint reports that in a July 2019 call, Trump had asked Ukrainian president Volodymyr Zelensky to investigate potential 2020 rival presidential candidate Joe Biden and his son Hunter Biden, as well as matters pertaining to whether Russian interference occurred in the 2016 U.S. election with regard to Democratic National Committee servers and the company Crowdstrike. Trump allegedly nominated his personal lawyer Rudy Giuliani and Attorney General William Barr to work with Ukraine on these matters. Additionally, the whistleblower alleged that the White House attempted to "lock down" the call records in a cover-up, and that the call was part of a wider pressure campaign by Giuliani and the Trump administration to urge Ukraine to investigate the Bidens. The whistleblower posits that the pressure campaign may have included Trump cancelling Vice President Mike Pence's May 2019 Ukraine trip, and Trump withholding financial aid from Ukraine in July 2019.

Inspector General Atkinson found the whistleblower's complaint both urgent and credible, so he transmitted the complaint on August 26 to Joseph Maguire, the acting Director of National Intelligence (DNI). Under the law, Maguire was supposed to forward the complaint to the Senate and House Intelligence Committees within a week. Maguire refused, so Atkinson informed the congressional committees of the existence of the complaint, but not its content. The general counsel for Maguire's office said that since the complaint was not about someone in the intelligence community, it was not an "urgent concern" and thus there was no need to pass it to Congress. Later testifying before the House Intelligence Committee on September 26, Maguire said he had consulted with the White House Counsel and the Justice Department's Office of Legal Counsel, of which the latter office gave him the rationale to withhold the complaint. Maguire also testified: "I think the whistleblower did the right thing. I think he followed the law every step of the way."

On September 22, Trump confirmed that he had discussed with Zelensky how "we don't want our people like Vice President Biden and his son creating to the corruption already in the Ukraine." Trump also confirmed that he had indeed temporarily withheld military aid from Ukraine, offering contradicting reasons for his decision on September 23 and 24.

On September 24, House Speaker Nancy Pelosi announced the start of a formal impeachment inquiry. On September 25, the White House released a non-verbatim transcript of the call between Trump and Zelensky; while the members and staff of congressional intelligence committees were allowed to read whistleblower complaint. On September 26, the White House declassified the whistleblower's complaint, so Schiff released the complaint to the public. The non-verbatim transcript corroborated the main allegations of the whistleblower's report about the Trump–Zelensky call. The non-verbatim transcript stated that after Zelensky discussed the possibility of buying American anti-tank missiles to defend Ukraine, Trump instead asked for a favor, suggesting an investigation of the company Crowdstrike, while later in the call he also called for an investigation of the Bidens, and cooperation with Giuliani and Barr. On September 27, the White House confirmed the whistleblower's allegation that the Trump administration had stored the Trump–Zelensky transcript in a highly classified system.

Following these revelations, members of congress largely divided along party lines, with Democrats generally in favor of impeachment proceedings and Republicans defending the president. Ukraine envoy Kurt Volker resigned and three House committees issued a subpoena to Secretary of State Mike Pompeo to schedule depositions for Volker and four other State Department employees, and to compel the release of documents. Attention to the issue also led to further revelations by anonymous sources. These included the misuse of classification systems to hide records of conversations with Ukrainian, Russian and Saudi Arabian leaders, and statements made to Sergei Lavrov and Sergey Kislyak in May 2017 expressing disconcern about Russian interference in U.S. elections.

Use of the Office of President 
Trump often sought to use the office of the presidency for his own interest. Under his leadership, the Justice Department, which is traditionally independent from the President, became highly partisan and acted in Trump's interest.
Bloomberg News reported in October 2019 that during a 2017 Oval Office meeting, Trump had asked Secretary of State Rex Tillerson to pressure the Justice Department to drop a criminal investigation of Reza Zarrab, an Iranian-Turkish gold trader who was a client of Trump associate Rudy Giuliani. Tillerson reportedly refused.

Trump attempted to host the 2020 G7 Summit at his Doral Golf Resort, from which he could have made significant profits. Trump visited his properties 274 times during his presidency. Government officials were charged as much as $650 per night to stay at Trump's properties.

In the lead up to the 2020 election, Trump and Postmaster General Louis DeJoy, a close ally of Trump, sought to hamper the US postal service by cutting funding and services, a move which would prevent postal votes from being counted during the COVID-19 pandemic.

Trump has fired, demoted or withdrawn numerous government officials in retaliation for actions that projected negatively on his public image, or harmed his personal or political interests, including Federal Bureau of Investigation (FBI) Director James Comey, Deputy FBI Director Andrew McCabe, U.S. Attorney General Jeff Sessions, and Director of National Intelligence Joseph Maguire.

In December 2020, shortly before Christmas and in his last month in office, Trump granted 26 people full pardons and commuted the sentences of three others convicted of federal crimes. Those who benefitted included his former campaign advisor Paul Manafort, advisor and personal friend Roger Stone and Charles Kushner, father of Trump's son-in-law and confidant Jared Kushner. In the final hours of his presidency, Donald Trump pardoned nearly 74 people, including rappers, financiers, and former members of congress. Those pardoned include his former senior adviser Steve Bannon, Jared Kushner's friend charged with cyberstalking, Ken Kurson; a real estate lawyer, Albert Pirro; and rappers prosecuted on federal weapons offenses, Lil Wayne and Kodak Black. Trump also pardoned his former fundraiser Elliott Broidy, who worked for China, the UAE, and Russia at the White House. Broidy also lobbied the US government to end the investigations in the 1MDB scandal.

According to several reports, Trump's and his family's trips in the first month of his presidency cost U.S. taxpayers nearly as much as former president Obama's travel expenses for an entire year. When Obama was president, Trump frequently criticized him for taking vacations which were paid for with public funds. The Washington Post reported that Trump's atypically lavish lifestyle is far more expensive to the taxpayers than what was typical of former presidents and could end up in the hundreds of millions of dollars over the whole of Trump's term.

A June 2019 analysis by the Washington Post found that federal officials and GOP campaigns had spent at least $1.6million at businesses owned by Trump during his presidency. This was an undercount, as most of the data on spending by government officials covered only the first few months of Trump's presidency.

Elections during the Trump presidency

2018 mid-term election

In the 2018 mid-term elections, Democrats had a blue wave, winning control of the House of Representatives, while Republicans expanded their majority in the Senate.

2020 re-election campaign

On June 18, 2019, Trump announced that he would seek re-election in the 2020 presidential election. Trump did not face any significant rivals for the 2020 Republican nomination, with some state Republican parties cancelling the presidential primaries in the states. Trump's Democratic opponent in the general election was former Vice President Joe Biden of Delaware. The election on November 3 was not called for either candidate for several days. On November 7, the Associated Press along with mainstream media called the race for Joe Biden.

It was the first presidency since that of Herbert Hoover in 1932 in which a sitting president was defeated and his party lost its majorities in both chambers of Congress.

Lost re-election and transition period 

Trump refused to concede, and the administration did not begin cooperating with president-elect Biden's transition team until November 23. In late December 2020, Biden and his transition team criticized Trump administration political appointees for hampering the transition and failing to cooperate with the Biden transition team on national security areas, such as the Defense and State departments, as well as on the economic response to the COVID-19 pandemic, saying that many of the agencies that are critical to their security have incurred enormous damage and have been hollowed outin personnel, capacity and in morale. Throughout December and January, Trump continued to insist that he had won the election. He filed numerous lawsuits alleging election fraud, tried to persuade state and federal officials to overturn the results, and urged his supporters to rally on his behalf. At the urging and direction of Trump campaign attorneys and other Trump associates, including Rudy Giuliani and Steve Bannon, Republican activists in seven states filed and submitted false documents claiming to be the official presidential electors. The "alternate slates" were intended to serve as a reason for Congress or the Vice President to reject the results from the seven states.

U.S. Capitol attack 

On January 6, 2021, rioters supporting Trump stormed the U.S. Capitol in an effort to thwart a joint session of Congress during which the Electoral College vote was to be certified, affirming the election of former vice president Joe Biden as president.

During an initial rally earlier that morning, Trump encouraged his supporters to march to the U.S. Capitol. Subsequently, pro-Trump attendees marched to the Capitol building, joined other protesters, and stormed the building. Congress was in session at the time, conducting the Electoral College vote count and debating the results of the vote. As the protesters arrived, Capitol security evacuated the Senate and House of Representatives chambers and locked down several other buildings on the Capitol campus. Later that evening, after the Capitol was secured, Congress went back into session to discuss the Electoral College vote, finally affirming at 3:41a.m. that Biden had won the election.

Five casualties occurred during the event: one Capitol Police officer, and four stormers or protesters at the Capitol, including one rioter shot by police inside the building. At least 138 police officers (73 Capitol Police officers, 65 Metropolitan Police Department officers) were injured, including at least 15 who were hospitalized, some with severe injuries. Three improvised explosive devices were reported to have been found: one each on Capitol grounds, at the Republican National Committee and Democratic National Committee offices.

Aftermath 

Following the Capitol attack, several cabinet-level officials and White House staff resigned, citing the incident and Trump's behavior. On January 6, the night of the storming, a number of White House officials submitted their resignations, including Stephanie Grisham (chief of staff to the first lady), Deputy National Security Advisor Matt Pottinger, White House Social Secretary Anna Cristina Niceta Lloyd, and Deputy White House Press Secretary Sarah Matthews. More officials continued to resign, including Secretary of Transportation Elaine Chao, Secretary of Education Betsy DeVos, chair of the Council of Economic Advisers Tyler Goodspeed, and former White House chief of staff and special envoy to Northern Ireland Mick Mulvaney.

On January 7, the day after the Electoral College results were certified by Congress, Trump tweeted a video in which he stated, "A new administration will be inaugurated on January 20th. My focus now turns to ensuring a smooth, orderly and seamless transition of power." The State Department subsequently told diplomats to affirm Biden's victory.

On January 12, the House voted in favor of requesting that the vice president remove Trump from office per the Twenty-fifth Amendment; hours earlier, Pence had indicated that he opposed such a measure. The next day, the House voted 232–197 to impeach Trump on a charge of "incitement of insurrection". Ten Republican representatives joined all Democratic representatives in voting to impeach Trump. Trump is the first and only president to be impeached twice. On February 13, the Senate voted 57–43 to convict Trump on a charge of inciting insurrection, ten votes short of the required two-thirds majority, and he was acquitted. Seven Republican senators joined all Democratic and independent senators in voting to convict Trump.
Trump gave a farewell address the day prior to the inauguration of Joe Biden. In it he stressed his economic and foreign policy record, and said the country can never tolerate "political violence". Breaking from tradition, Trump did not attend Biden's inauguration, becoming the first departing president in 152 years to refuse to attend his elected successor's inauguration, but he did honor another tradition by leaving Biden a letter on the Resolute desk in the White House.

Historical evaluations and public opinion 

In the sixth Siena College Research Institute's presidential rankings, conducted after Trump had been in office for one year, Trump was ranked as the third-worst president. C-SPAN's 2021 President Historians Survey ranked Trump as the fourth-worst president overall and the worst in the leadership characteristics of Moral Authority and Administrative Skills. Trump's best rated leadership characteristic was Public Persuasion, where he ranked 32nd out of the 44 individuals who were previously president.

At the time of the 2016 election, polls by Gallup found Trump had a favorable rating around 35% and an unfavorable rating around 60%, while Clinton held a favorable rating of 40% and an unfavorable rating of 57%. 2016 was the first election cycle in modern presidential polling in which both major-party candidates were viewed so unfavorably. By January 20, 2017, Inauguration Day, Trump's approval rating average was 42%, the lowest rating average for an incoming president in the history of modern polling; during his term it was an "incredibly stable (and also historically low)" 36% to 40%. Trump was the only president to never reach a 50% approval rating in the Gallup poll dating to 1938.

Since the beginning of the presidency of Donald Trump, ratings of how well U.S. democracy is functioning sharply plunged. According to the 2018 Varieties of Democracy Annual Democracy Report, there has been "a significant democratic backsliding in the United States [since the Inauguration of Donald Trump]... attributable to weakening constraints on the executive." Independent assessments by Freedom House and Bright Line Watch found a similar significant decline in overall democratic functioning.

See also 

 Bibliography of Donald Trump
 Efforts to impeach Donald Trump
 
 Make America Great Again
 Political positions of Donald Trump
 First 100 days of Donald Trump's presidency
 List of federal political scandals in the United States (21st century)
 Timeline of investigations into Trump and Russia
 Timeline of Russian interference in the 2016 United States elections
 Timeline of Russian interference in the 2016 United States elections (July 2016–election day)

References 
Footnotes

Citations

Further reading 

 Albrecht, Don E. "Donald Trump and changing rural/urban voting patterns." Journal of Rural Studies 91 (2022): 148-156.

 Alexandre, Ilo, Joseph Jai-sung Yoo, and Dhiraj Murthy. "Make Tweets Great Again: Who Are Opinion Leaders, and What Did They Tweet About Donald Trump?." Social Science Computer Review 40.6 (2022): 1456-1477. online

 Baker, Joseph O., and Christopher D. Bader. "Xenophobia, Partisanship, and Support for Donald Trump and the Republican Party." Race and Social Problems 14.1 (2022): 69-83.
 Baker, Peter, and Susan Glasser. The Divider: Trump in the White House, 2017-2021 (2022) excerpt
 Barrett-Fox, Rebecca. "A King Cyrus president: How Donald Trump’s presidency reasserts conservative Christians’ right to hegemony." Humanity & Society 42.4 (2018): 502-522.
 Dubinsky, Yoav. "Sports, Brand America and US public diplomacy during the presidency of Donald Trump." in Place Branding and Public Diplomacy (2021) pp: 1-14.
 Holzer, Harold. The Presidents vs. the Press: The Endless Battle Between the White House and the Media--from the Founding Fathers to Fake News (Dutton, 2020) pp. 402–443. online 

 Jarvis, Sharon E., and Dakota Park-Ozee. "The Qualitative Power of a Crowd: Trump’s Rallies, Public Opinion, Attention Economy." American Behavioral Scientist (2022): 00027642221091203.
 Kazin, Michael. What It Took to Win: A History of the Democratic Party (2022).
 Kennedy, Rodney Wallace. The Immaculate Mistake: How Evangelicals Gave Birth to Donald Trump (Wipf and Stock Publishers, 2021).
 Locatelli, Andrea, and Andrea Carati. "Trump’s Legacy and the Liberal International Order: Why Trump Failed to Institutionalise an Anti-global Agenda."  International Spectator (2022): 1-17.
 Löfflmann, Georg. "‘Enemies of the people’: Donald Trump and the security imaginary of America First." British Journal of Politics and International Relations 24.3 (2022): 543-560. online

 Mercieca, Jennifer. Demagogue for president: The rhetorical genius of Donald Trump (Texas A&M University Press, 2020).

 Pfiffner, James P. "President Trump and the Shallow State: Disloyalty at the Highest Levels." Presidential Studies Quarterly 52.3 (2022): 573-595. online

 Pfiffner, James P. "Donald Trump and the Norms of the Presidency." Presidential Studies Quarterly 51.1 (2021): 96-124. online

 Phipps, E. Brooke, and Fielding Montgomery. "“Only YOU Can Prevent This Nightmare, America”: Nancy Pelosi As the Monstrous-Feminine in Donald Trump’s YouTube Attacks." Women's Studies in Communication 45.3 (2022): 316-337.

 Ruisch, Benjamin C., and Melissa J. Ferguson. "Changes in Americans’ prejudices during the presidency of Donald Trump." Nature Human Behaviour 6.5 (2022): 656-665. online
 Zelizer, Julian E. ed. The Presidency of Donald J. Trump: A First Historical Assessment (2022) excerpt

Historiography, memory and teaching

 Bauer, A. J. "The alternative historiography of the Alt-Right: Conservative historical subjectivity from the tea party to Trump." in Far-right revisionism and the end of history (Routledge, 2020) pp. 120-137.
 Benn, Jesse, and Jeff Tischauser. "Not Two Sides of the Same Coin: Avoiding False Equivalencies Teaching Political Journalism After Trump." in The Future of the Presidency, Journalism, and Democracy (Routledge, 2022) pp. 296-313.

 Brown, Robert E. "The American histories of president Trump: beyond the Jacksonian parallel." American behavioral scientist 66.1 (2022): 43-60. online

 Conway III, Lucian G., and Alivia Zubrod. "Are US Presidents becoming less rhetorically complex? Evaluating the integrative complexity of Joe Biden and Donald Trump in historical context." Journal of Language and Social Psychology  41.5 (2022): 613-625.

 Fischer, Fritz. "Teaching Trump in the History Classroom." Journal of American History 108.4 (2022): 772-778; in college courses online
 Karpman, Hannah E., and Rory Crath. "Teaching Note—Teaching Trumpism." Journal of Social Work Education (2022): 1-8. online

  Pulitzer Prize winning critic evaluates 150 recent books on Trump Administration.

 Lund, John G. " 'Everything is Political Now': Teaching Politics in the Age of Trump" (PhD  dissertation, DePaul University, 2022) online; teaching high school history and government

 Zelizer, Julian E. ed. The Presidency of Donald J. Trump: A First Historical Assessment (2022) excerpt

Political Memoirs and Primary Sources

External links

 "The Trump Cabinet" (2017). Congressional Quarterly reports on Trump's cabinet activity
 Trump White House ArchivesBriefings and Statements
 Trump White House ArchivesRemarks

 
Trump, Donald
Donald Trump
2010s in the United States
2020s in the United States
2010s in American politics
2020s in American politics
2017 establishments in the United States
2021 disestablishments in the United States
Articles containing video clips